= 2010 Northern Hemisphere heat waves =

Summer heat waves

2010 Northern Hemisphere summer heat waves
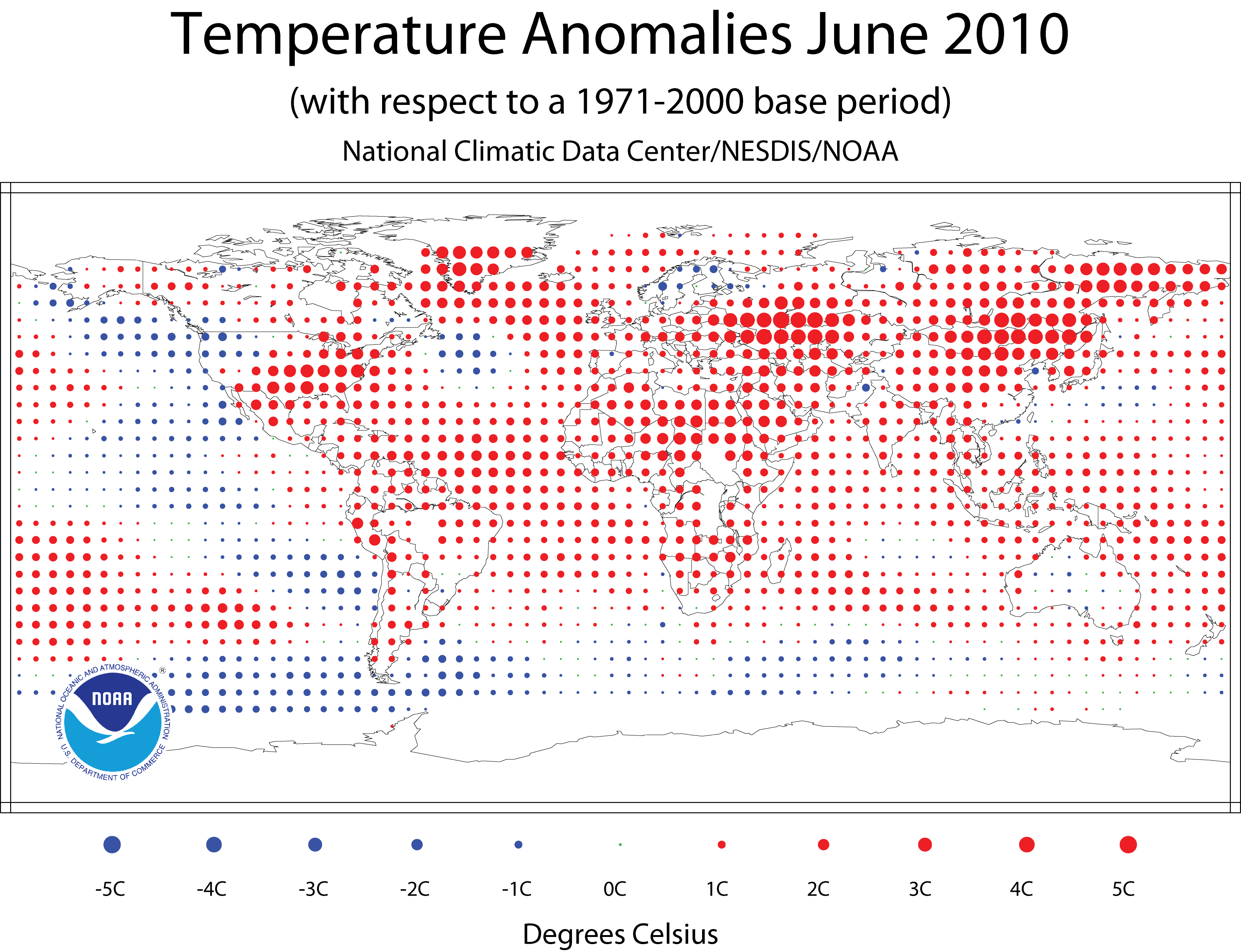
- A map of the above-average temperatures, caused by the global heat waves, in June 2010.

Meteorological history
- Formed: April 26, 2010
- Dissipated: October 21, 2010

Heat waves

Overall effects
- Fatalities: 55,000 in Russia alone, ~2,600 outside Russia
- Damage: ~$500 billion (2011 USD)
- Areas affected: Africa, Asia, Europe, and North America

The 2010 Northern Hemisphere summer heat waves included severe heat waves that impacted most of the United States, Kazakhstan, Mongolia, China, Hong Kong, North Africa and the European continent as a whole, along with parts of Canada, Russia, Indochina, South Korea and Japan during July 29, 2010. The first phase of the global heatwaves was caused by a moderate El Niño event, which lasted from June 2009 to May 2010. This lasted only from April 2010 to June 2010 and caused only moderate above-average temperatures in the affected regions, but it also set new record high temperatures for most of the area affected in the Northern Hemisphere.

The second, more devastating phase was caused by a very strong La Niña event, which lasted from June 2010 to June 2011. According to meteorologists, the 2010–11 La Niña event was one of the strongest La Niña events ever observed. That same La Niña event also had devastating effects in the Eastern states of Australia. The second phase lasted from June 2010 to October 2010, caused severe heat waves, and multiple record-breaking temperatures. The heatwaves began in April 2010, when strong anticyclones began to develop, over most of the affected regions, in the Northern Hemisphere. The heatwaves ended in October 2010, when the powerful anticyclones over most of the affected areas dissipated.

The heat wave during the summer of 2010 was at its worst in June, over the Eastern United States, Middle East, Eastern Europe and European Russia, and over Northeastern China and southeastern Russia. June 2010 marked the fourth consecutive warmest month on record globally, at 0.66 °C (1.2 °F) above average, while the period April–June was the warmest ever recorded for land areas in the Northern Hemisphere, at 1.25 °C (2.25 °F) above average. The previous record for the global average temperature in June was set in 2005 at 0.66 °C (33.19 °F), and the previous warm record for April–June over Northern Hemisphere land areas was 1.16 °C (34.09 °F), set in 2007.

The strongest of the anticyclones, the one situated over Siberia, registered a maximum high pressure of 1040 millibars. The weather caused forest fires in China, where three in a team of 300 died fighting a fire that broke out in the Binchuan County of Dali, as Yunnan suffered the worst drought in 60 years by February 17. A major drought was reported across the Sahel as early as January. In August, a section of the Petermann Glacier tongue connecting northern Greenland, the Nares Strait and the Arctic Ocean broke off, the biggest ice shelf in the Arctic to detach in 48 years. By the time the heatwaves had ended in late October 2010, about $500 billion (2011 USD) of damage was done, in the Northern Hemisphere alone.

More than 55,000 people died during the heat wave in Russia, making it the 6th deadliest natural disaster of its decade, only months after the 2010 Haiti earthquake. The World Meteorological Organization stated that the heat waves, droughts and flooding events fit with predictions based on global warming for the 21st century, include those based on the Intergovernmental Panel on Climate Change's 2007 4th Assessment Report. Some climatologists argue that these weather events would not have happened if the atmospheric carbon dioxide was at pre-industrial levels.

== Events ==
=== Europe ===
==== Europe in general ====
A heat wave hit Eastern Europe as exceptionally strong jet stream winds blew in from the Sahara across the Balkans and into both Poland and Ukraine on June 10. The Polish Institute of Meteorology and Water Management (IMGW) warned of temperatures in Poland exceeding 30 °C (86 °F) for the next 5 days, followed by heavy winds, rain storms, thunderstorms and possible flooding especially in the north-west of the country and neighbouring parts of Germany.

The period between June 13 and 19 saw a low pressure zone move south eastwards taking a shallow pool of cooler air south eastwards across from the North Atlantic into Ireland and most of the United Kingdom.

As the floods eased in Central Europe and the Balkans, apart from those in Romania, temperatures began to climb across Western Europe, including Frankfurt am Main in Germany and the United Kingdom on June 30.

On July 2, Brussels saw its hottest day since 1976 and France, Germany and the Spanish resort Benidorm experienced record temperatures. Several heavy thunderstorms hit the Low Swiss Alps, accompanied by heavy sleet in some places.

On July 3, a heat wave hit parts of Ryazan Oblast, Krasnodar Krai, and the cities of Copenhagen, Bucharest and Budapest, killing a Romanian man with heat stroke. Heavy thunderstorms hit the High Swiss Alps, accompanied by heavy snow in some places.

On July 6, 3 low pressure areas moved towards and settled near the Black Sea after a week a high pressure in the region's jet stream far northward in its trek through Europe. The National Oceanic and Atmospheric Administration's GFS numerical model predicted the same weather for the following week.

A meteorological synoptic pressure corridor ran from Germany and Poland east and northeast to western and north western Russia causing temperatures that were 4 °C, 8 °C and in one case 10 °C above the seasonal norm. Cities from Berlin and Warsaw to Kyiv, Minsk, Moscow and St. Petersburg may well reach the 33 °C to 35 °C range.

Berlin and Warsaw recorded temperatures of 33 °C, while highs of nearly 34 °C in Moscow broke records. Earlier in June, temperatures in Minsk hit 30 °C, while temperatures as high as 34 °C were observed in Kyiv.

By July 8, a major heat wave hit most of Europe, European Russia and North America.

Both the French and Belgian authorities were on alert to respond to possible incidences of heat-related illnesses following the death of a Frenchman in the north of the country due to heat exhaustion. Brussels saw its next hottest day since 1976, while Portugal and Germany experienced record high temperatures.

Austria's Central Institute for Meteorology and Geodynamics (ZAMG) issued public safety warnings on the 8th as it predicted temperatures as high as 35 °C (95 °F) by the weekend. The centre expected similar conditions continuing into the beginning of next week, where it would end in a heavy Alpine downpour.

The Swiss Meteorological Office reported that a record 34.8C was set in Basel and warned of both forest fires in the persistently drought-hit southern canton of Valais. The Swiss Health Office offered the public safety advice. The ozone level rose badly and was more than twice the permitted level at 257 microgrammes per cubic metre in Lugano on Friday, and things were in a generally bad condition across the Swiss Alps as a whole. Extreme heat and ozone levels were also harming tourists at the Gotthard Road Tunnel on the 8th and 9th.

The Swiss Ornithological Institute, based in Sempach, said young swifts were stifling to death and others were jumping out before they could fly properly, as temperatures reached 50 °C (122 °F) in their under the roof nests. Most of them lived at the institute care home.

A heavy rainy thunderstorm hit Zürich on the 10th and the Swiss-French border. They also threatened to close the Avoriaz stage of the Tour de France cycle race.

The UK declared a heat wave, set at Met Office Level 2/4, for the period 9–16 July 2010 for South East England and East Anglia. This was after temperatures reached 31.0 °C (87.8 °F) in London and night-time temperatures leveled around 21 °C (70 °F).

The UK recorded its highest temperature of the year, 31.7 °C (89.1 °F), in Gravesend, Kent, as the British Health Protection Agency gave out health advice and claimed there had been "several hundred" more deaths than normal over the previous two weeks and some appeared to be linked to the heat on the 11th.

July 11 and 12 saw heatstroke make several people ill throughout the Iberian Peninsula, European Russia, Belarus, eastern Poland and Ukraine.

The heat wave that left Morocco for the Iberian Peninsula on the 11th was attributed to the regional hot air currents that departed from the Sahara in Northern Africa at about 1000 meters (1 km) in altitude, which facilitated a movement in the hot air towards the Balkans and Ukraine via the Straits of Gibraltar, Spain and Italy.

On July 11, temperatures skyrocketed in Vienna, Berlin, Munich, Amsterdam, Madrid, Lisbon, Zurich and Bucharest. More heavy thunderstorms hit the High Swiss Alps, accompanied by heavy snow in some places.

Forty passengers were hospitalised with dehydration in Germany when 3 ICE trains' air conditioning system broke down in temperatures approaching 40 °C on the 11th. One thousand luckier passengers switched trains. Deutsche Bahn apologized for its ICE trains breaking down.

Hartmut Buyken, chairman of passenger association Pro Bahn, told radio station hr-INFO that the trains had been ruined by cost-cutting measures, and weren't selling as well in international markets as the French TGV trains.

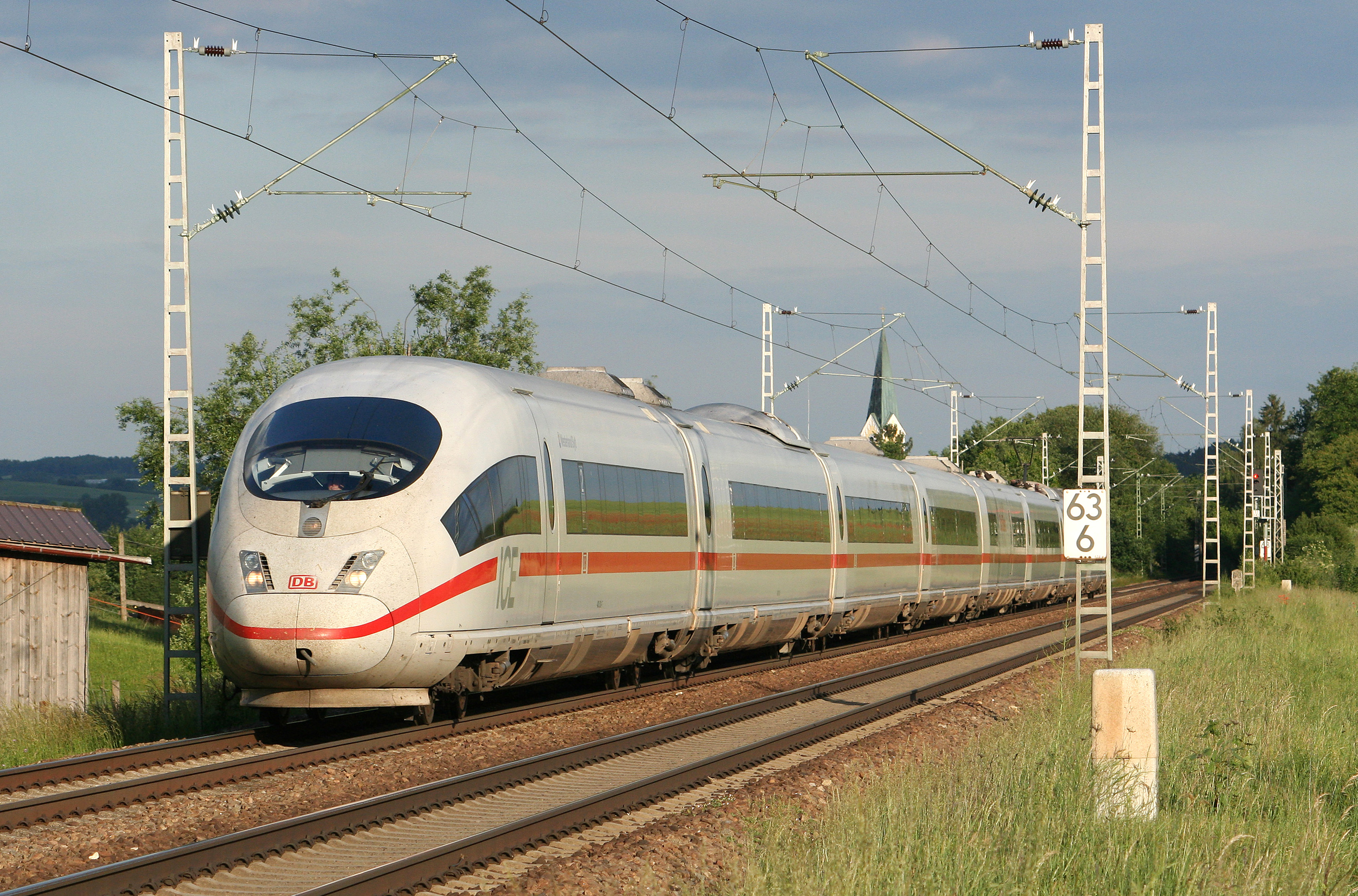
A 2007 image of German express ICE 3 transit train near Ingolstadt.

On the 12th, Portugal, Spain, Germany, Great Britain, Belgium, France, and the Czech Republic all suffered the hottest temperatures of the year, and the heat wave was most likely to continue over the weekend, according to German meteorologists.

Most of Germany, including Berlin, recorded temperatures of 38 °C (100 °F) in some places. On the popular North Sea island of Helgoland, the temperature was only 20.5 degrees. In Berlin, the highest temperature was recorded at 38.9 °C (102.0 °F) as 3 more non-air conditioned local passengers trains had to be evacuated due to overheating of the interior passenger compartments, leading to passengers getting heat stroke, Deutsche Welle reported. Hans-Dieter Muehlenberg, chief of a local rescue squad in Berlin told the German news agency DAPD he had found the temperature in a local train had reached 50 °C (122 °F) and that nine people had to be hospitalized for dehydration. Later on, official reports from the rescue squad denied that 9 people reported dead had died and that the air conditioning systems fail to cool the trains in temperatures over 32 °C (90 °F). Deutsche Bahn paid 500 Euros for the heat victims without a doctors note. According to the German Meteorological Service (DWD), the soaring temperatures were set to last for a week.

Belgian authorities expressed concerns about water shortages as a result of both the hot weather and lack of rain. The water authorities in the eastern town of Bullange warned that several water sources dried up. The Belgian interior ministry said that three other communes in the southeast of the country appealed for emergency water supplies.

The Czech Republic exceeded 37.8 °C (100.0 °F) for three days running, as doctors in the Czech Republic issued safety advice according to the Voice of Russia. High temperatures were also occurring in parts of Slovakia and around the Black Sea.

The heat wave began to end as heavy rain hits the Swansea-Port Talbot region of Wales, Devon, central Ireland and parts of eastern France.

Both Alpine and North Sea thunderstorms swept across southeast and northwest Germany respectively. Heavy rainfall is also reported in parts of the Netherlands, Ireland, Normandy and the English Midlands on the 13th. Both melting glaciers and heavy rain in the Alps caused avalanches and flash floods in Switzerland. A nationwide near-record temperature of 39.4 °C (102.9 °F) was recorded in parts of Sion in Valais Canton, south west Switzerland on the 13th.

Thunderstorms hit the English Midlands, Oxfordshire, Ireland, Northern Ireland and parts of the Swiss Alps. The heat wave ended in the British Isles and Northwest Europe on the 14th.

July 16 saw the heat wave peak in intensity throughout Italy, the Vatican, San Marino and Malta. The Civil Protection Board issued a heat warning for the 16th and 17th. The cities of Bolzano, Brescia, Florence, Genoa, Milan, Perugia, Rome, Turin, Trieste, Venice, Campobasso, Civitavecchia, Frosinone, Latina, Messina, Rieti, Verona and Viterbo. were at the maximum level 3 heat alert, with three other cities in South Tyrol (which has the highest temperatures for 90 years) being affected on the following day. The Health Minister Ferruccio Fazio told the Health and Social Services of the regions, General Practitioners (MMG) and local Prefects to take emergency measures. Foggia's town council gave free meals to those over age 65 due to temperatures of 40 °C (104 °F) and Rome issued over 200,000 bottles water to its citizens over three days.

Heavy storms hit Vienna on July 16 and 17, ending the week-long heat wave in Austria.

A new heat record of Finland was recorded at Joensuu on 29 July when temperature rose to 37.2 °C (99.0 °F). In Sweden, temperatures were above the average maximum temperature, with Stockholm seeing temperatures of 32.5 degrees Celsius according to the Swedish Meteorogical Institute SMHI.

The Russian high temperature record dating back to 1940 was beaten on 12 July, when Utta in the Kalmykian Republic, registered 45.4 °C (113.7 °F). The highest temperature at a non-automated station was 44 °C (111 °F) in Yashkul, Kalmykia, also beating the previous record. The record for Asian Russia was also beaten: 42.7 °C (108.9 °F) was recorded in Ust-Karsk on 27 June, beating the record of 42.3 °C (108.1 °F) set in Belogorsk, Amur Oblast, two days earlier.

==== Poland ====
A heat wave hit Eastern Europe as exceptionally strong jet stream winds blew in from the Sahara across the Balkans and into both Poland and Ukraine on 10 June. The Polish Institute of Meteorology and Water Management (IMGW) warned of temperature in Poland exceeding 30 °C (86 °F) for the next 5 days, followed by heavy winds, rain storms, thunderstorms and possible flooding especially in the northwest of the country and neighbouring parts of Germany.

==== The Iberian Peninsula ====
A Portuguese man also died on the 7th, in Villar del Rey, Badajoz, Spain.

Two Spaniards died of heat stroke as temperatures hovered around 33 °C-35 °C in central Spain on July 9. One victim was in Central Spain and the other was in Sevilla. The woman from Sevilla had been admitted to the local Virgen Macarena Hospital said the woman had also had multi-organ failure.

On July 11, temperatures in the Iberian Peninsula climbed to an average of 43 °C as Spain witnessed temperatures up to 44 °C as the three-week-old heat wave continued; Madrid's temperatures climbed to 41 °C (106 °F).

On the 12th, Portugal, Spain, Germany, Great Britain, Belgium, France, and the Czech Republic all suffered the hottest temperatures of the year, and the heat wave was most likely to continue over the weekend, according to German meteorologists.

Spain suffered three deaths, including that of an 80-year-old man. The national meteorological agency, Aemet, warned of exceptionally warm temperatures in central and southern Spain, with some areas expected to reach 39 °C.

More than 1,200 fire-fighters fought 25 forest fires in northern Portugal on July 24

Temperatures of up to 40 °C (104 °F) hit the Portuguese town at Pataias on the 27th.

All of Rebordelo, Santa Maria da Feira, Aveiro, Braga, Sobradelo da Goma, Povoa de Lanhoso, Porto, Viana do Castelo, Coimbra, Viseu, Leiria, Albergaria-a-Velha and Oliveira de Azemeis were ablaze. The A1 motorway connecting Lisbon with Porto was closed due to low visibility caused by the smoke on the 27th. The Portuguese Army dispatched about 150 soldiers to fire-affected towns.

Two Italian water bomber planes were loaned to Portugal through the European Union's solidarity mechanism on July 28. Spain also provided its neighbours with water bomber aircraft, but Portugal requested further help from the EU and Spain. France readied a plane on the French island of Corsica, just in case things got any worse in Portugal.

==== The Balkans ====
A heat wave hit Southern Europe as exceptionally strong jet stream winds blew in from the Sahara across the Balkans and into both Poland and Ukraine on 10 June. The Polish Institute of Meteorology and Water Management (IMGW) warned of temperature in Poland exceeding 30C for the next 5 days, followed by heavy winds, rain storms, thunderstorms and possible flooding especially in the north-west of the country and neighbouring parts of Germany.

As the floods eased in Central Europe and the Balkans, apart from those in Romania, temperatures began to climb across Western Europe, including Frankfurt in Germany and the UK on June 30.

In mid June, much of Europe experienced very warm conditions, whilst Central Europe was being flooded. Ruse, Bulgaria hit 36.6 °C (97.9 °F) on the 13th making it the warmest spot in Europe. Other records broken on the 13th includes Vidin, Bulgaria at 35.8 °C (96.4 °F), Sandanski, Bulgaria hitting 35.5 °C (95.9 °F), Lovech and Pazardzhik, Bulgaria at 35.1 °C (95.2 °F) as well as the capital, Sofia, hitting 33.3 °C (91.9 °F). The heat comes from the Sahara desert and is not associated with rain. This helped the situation with high water levels in that part of the continent.

On the 14th, several cities were once again above the 35 °C (95 °F) mark even though they did not break records. The only cities in Bulgaria breaking records were Musala, peak hitting 17.6 °C (63.7 °F), and Elhovo, hitting 35.6 °C (96.1 °F).

On the 15th, Ruse, Bulgaria peaked at 37.2 °C (99.0 °F). Although it was not a record, this was the highest temperature recorded in the country. Five Bulgarian cities broke high temperature records that day.

As the floods eased in Central Europe and the northern Balkans, apart from those in Romania, temperatures began to climb across Western Europe, including Frankfurt am Main in Germany and the UK on June 30.

On July 3, a heat wave hit parts of Ryazan Oblast, Krasnodar Krai, and the cities of Copenhagen, Bucharest and Budapest, killing a Romanian man with heat stroke. Heavy thunderstorms hit the High Swiss Alps, accompanied by heavy snow in some places.

Heavy rain fell in Podgorica, Bucharest and parts of eastern Serbia on July 16.

Both the 14th and 15th saw Niš's thermometer hit 38.7 °C (101.7 °F). This temperature value was approaching the national record of 39.5 °C (103.1 °F) from 2007. The National Meteorological and Hydrological Institute (NIMH) at the Serbian Academy of Sciences (SANU) were concerned with the changing temperature patterns. On July 17, Belgrade recorded temperatures in excess of 38 °C and 8 young people drowned swimming and bathing in various lakes.

=== Northern Eurasia (Commonwealth of Independent States) ===
Summer 2010 C.I.S. Heatwave
Meteorological history
- Formed: June 10, 2010
- Dissipated: August 13, 2010

Overall effects
- Fatalities: 58 confirmed, 15,801+ indirect deaths, 1 unconfirmed
- Areas affected: Western Russia, Ukraine, Kazakhstan, Belarus and Georgia

==== Georgia ====
Wild fires hit land near Tbilisi between August 1 and 3. A 3-day wildfire consumed about 150 hectares of forest in Georgia's central region, but was brought under control according to the Environment Protection Division of the Georgia Department of Natural Resources.

==== Kazakhstan ====
Central Kazakhstan witnessed a heavy spike in temperatures and a Kazakh farmer died of heat stroke on August 11. The hottest recorded temperature in Kazakhstan was 49.1 °C (120.4 °F), which set a new record, as the hottest temperature ever recorded in that country.

==== Russia ====
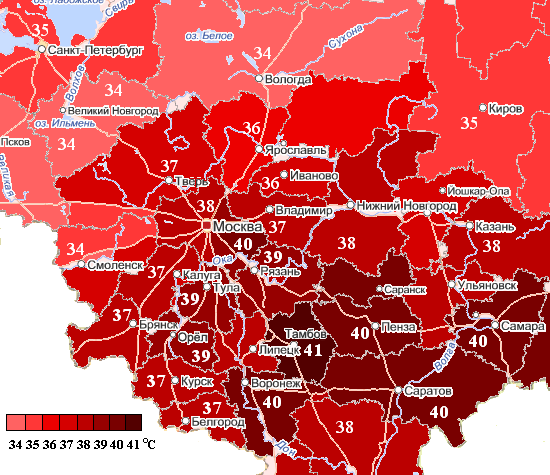
Temperatures in Central Russia on 31 July 2010

Later extreme event attribution studies concluded that the heatwave in Russia was made much more likely by climate change but that it made little difference to the intensity.

The abnormal heat wave was also experienced in Russia, causing fires throughout the country, the worst drought in nearly 40 years, and the loss of at least 9 million hectares of crops. According to head of Rosgidromet state weather agency Alexander Frolov, there was no such heat during the last 1000 years. The highest temperature ever recorded in Russia was 44.0 °C (111.2 °F), set on 11 July, in Yashkul, Kalmykia, beating the previous record of 43.8 °C (110.8 °F) set on 6 August 1940, also in Kalmykia. The initial soil drying in June and early July is thought to be a major cause of the exceptional heat level after mid-July.

On 25 June a temperature record was set in the Asian portion of Russia, at Belogorsk, at a reading of 42.3 °C (108.1 °F). The previous record in the Asian portion was 41.7 °C (107.1 °F) set at Aksha on 21 July 2004.

A heat wave started in Moscow on the 27 June, as temperatures reached 33.1 °C (91.6 °F), and stayed around 30 °C (90 °F) for the rest of the week. It also caused temperatures to rise noticeably in Yakutia, the Siberian Kuznetsk Alatau mountain range and the Volga Federal District.

On 28 June Kvass sales boomed in Russia.

On 30 June, the heat in Yakutia reached the temperature of 35.3 °C, as both the Siberian Federal District and Ural Federal District began to overheat.

By the end of June, 1,244 people had drowned in Russia after swimming.

On 3 July, a heat wave hit parts of Ryazan Oblast, Krasnodar Krai, and the cities of Copenhagen, Bucharest and Budapest, killing a Romanian man with heat stroke. Heavy thunderstorms hit the High Swiss Alps, accompanied by heavy snow in some places.

On 5 July, the Russian emergency ministry confirmed that almost 300 overheating people had drowned swimming in various lakes, canals and rivers during the heat wave. In one case at least 63 people died in one day alone. An emergency ministry spokesman told the Ria Novosti news agency that 285 people had died in Russia's waterways. The 285 deaths occurred mainly due to the fact that they had swum in dangerous locations, they were ill-prepared and/or were dangerously drunk. A Bulgarian tourist also fell ill with sun stroke in Ryazan. Moscow was hit by a minor cholera outbreak on 5 July.

Highs of nearly 34 °C (93 °F) in Moscow broke records. Earlier in June, Minsk hit 30 °C (86 °F) and Kyiv's temperature soared to 34 °C (93 °F). Saint Petersburg, however, has yet to see the 30-degree mark.

Temperatures hit a record-breaking highs of 37 °C in several regions in the Central Federal District on 5 July. In addition, the temperatures were becoming slightly hotter than usual throughout the Siberian Federal District. The official record temperature for European Russia was set at 43.8 °C on 6 August 1940. The Siberian record was set at 35.3 °C in the Yakutia, which was also seeing its provincial temperature rise.

Russia's weather forecasts said it was the most prolonged heat wave since 1981. Moscow's City Hall sent out water tankers to put water on the roads to prevent the tarmac from melting.

Moscow's temperature was 31 °C (88 °F) on 7 July. At the same time the heat in Yakutia recorded 35.3 °C. A record-breaking heat wave in late June saw temperatures reach 37 °C in several central Russian regions, sparking forest fires and causing heat stroke in many people in various parts of the Central Federal District and Ural Federal District.

On the 11 and 12 July, many people across Europe fell ill due to heat stroke caused by the very high temperatures reached on these two days.

A total of 14 regions suddenly overheated on the 11 to 13 July, including Tatarstan, Bashkortostan, Orenburg, Saratov, Samara Oblast as the heat cooked the partly drought hit Volga Federal District. Nineteen of Russia's 83 regions declared a state of emergency after crop failure caused by the heat-induced drought. Electricity demand went up by as much as 6% in some Oblasts, leading to power supply problems. Sales of ice-cream also went up by 10–15%. The lead into the summer heat wave in 2010 began as an abnormally warm autumn and spring in 2009–2010. World scientists consider the heatwave abnormal by today's standards, but warn that it will soon become the norm throughout summertime.

The 3 week heat wave hit near-record temperatures in Russia and Ukraine on the 13 July; with near-record temperatures of 40 °C in Saint Petersburg, Moscow and Kaliningrad.

On 13 July the Russian Bird conservation Union (RBCU) said that the heat was killing most of European Russia's birds, especially those in Moscow. Meteorologists considered it likely that temperatures would reach up to 36 °C (97 °F) later in the week.

On 14 July, central Russia saw record temperatures and was predicted to face 38 degrees Celsius by the weekend, higher than the all-time temperature record of 36.6 °C, set in August 1920. Owing to the drought, the government considered introducing a state of emergency in another two regions of the Russian Federation. Both Volga Federal District and Southern Federal District reported large rises in temperature. The City of Yakutsk, with temperatures set to stick at 35 degrees for the next few days. Dagestan was also reported to be suffering a heat wave that day. 5 Italians, a Latvian and a Russian also drowned in the lower reaches of the Volga, near Volgograd, all of whom were apparently drunk. As water levels in the River Volga have dropped Volga Federal District's drought swimming has become more risky due to hidden objects being closer to the surface and increased flying insect activity.

In the first half of July, average temperatures in Moscow were 6.2 °C above average. The hottest July on record in the city, in 1938, was an average of 5.3 °C higher than average.

Approximately 400 people had drowned by mid-July.

1,200 Russians had died June 1 and July 15 due to swimming whilst drunk. Six children and a Ukrainian tourist also drowned, whilst sober, in the Sea of Azov. Vadim Seryogin, from the Russian Emergency Ministry said that 95% of the drowned had been consuming alcohol. 9,000,000 hectares of farmland were destroyed along with 20% of the grain harvest in what appears to be the worst drought in 130 years.

In St. Petersburg, various temperature records were broken in July, and the maximum yearly temperature record was set on Wednesday, 28 July, when the temperature was 35.3 degrees Celsius (95.5 degrees Fahrenheit). This record was superseded on 7 August — 37.1 degrees Celsius (98.8 degrees Fahrenheit). The maximum temperature in Moscow was set on 29 July, when it was 38.2 degrees Celsius (100.8 degrees Fahrenheit).

Regions with wildfire spreading on 31 July

On July 30, wildfires killed 25 people, leaving more than 2000 people homeless. The fires were still burning on 1 August.

Likely in part due to the heat wave and smoke from forest fires, Moscow recorded 14,340 total deaths in the month of July, 4,824 more than the number recorded in July 2009. Pollution levels in the city were five times higher than normal.

On 1 August, the Patriarch of Moscow and All Russia led a holy mass to remember the 28 who had died since July 30. The forest fires came as Russia was experiencing its worst drought in just over 100 years. Russia's Emergency Situations Ministry said 774 forest fires had been registered, 6 new fires were rumoured to have started near Moscow, and a regional forestry department in the Central Federal District reported that the fires now cover approximately 100,000 hectares. Some 4,000 soldiers were called in to help fight both the 6 rumoured and several known fires in the Moscow Oblast. Over 5,000 people have been evacuated from their homes, and Vladimir Putin organised an emergency meeting for August 2, with the governors of the various regions in the Central and Southern Federal District devastated by the fires. The grain harvest in these areas was also destroyed.

August 2 saw hundreds of wildfires threatening more than 200 villages around both Voronezh, Moscow, Nizhny Novgorod and in Mordovia the chief of National Centre for Crisis Situations, General Vladimir Stepanov said. The Volga Federal District saw 625 homes destroyed and Voronezh saw over 200 destroyed and more than a thousand in both places evacuated," general Stepanov said as firemen, troops and local farmers struggled to drive the fires back from the cities of the Volga Federal District.

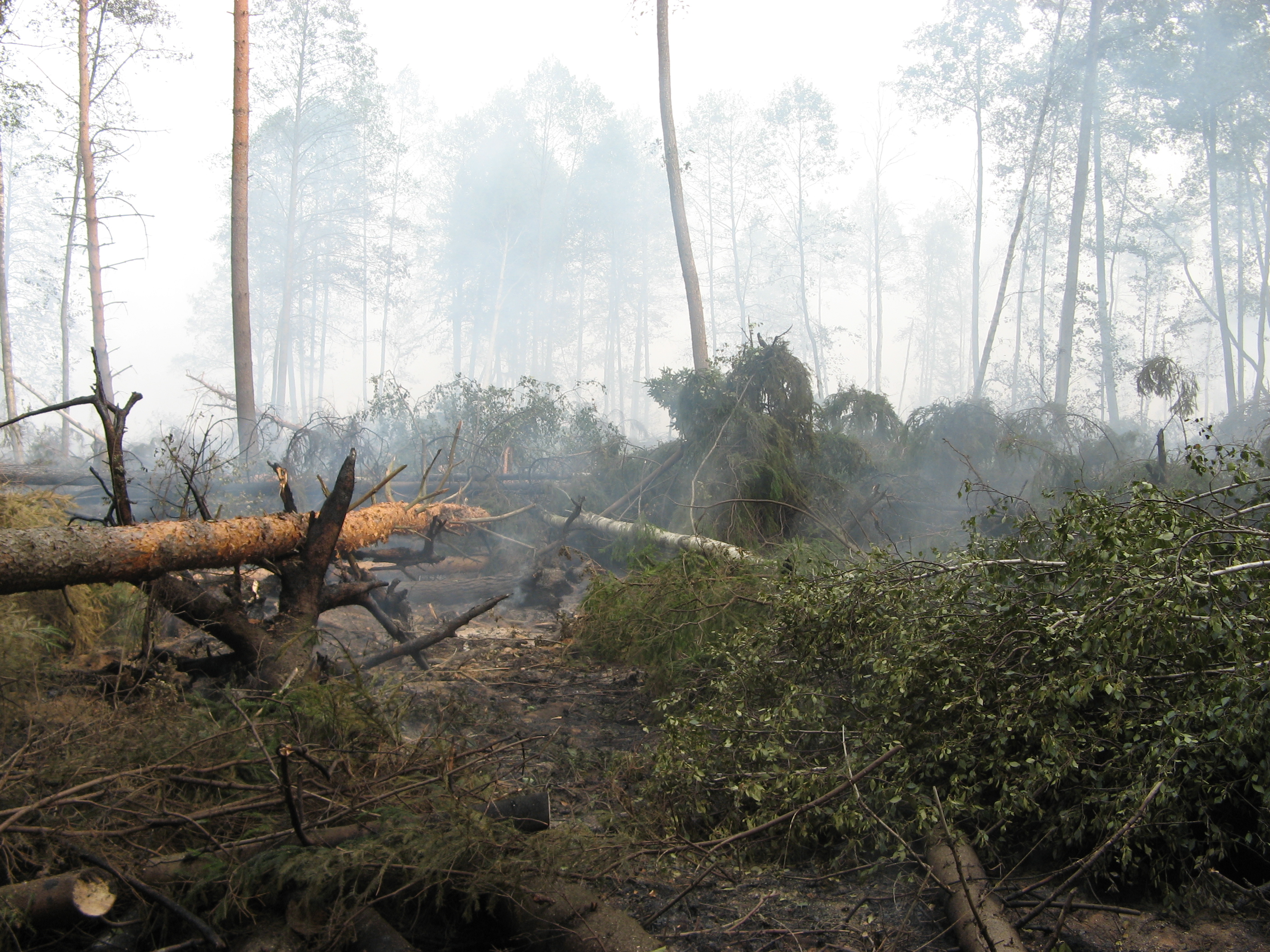
Front end of forest forest-peat fire fighting near Roshal town (Shatursky district. 13 aug 2010)

==== Ukraine ====
A heat wave hit Eastern Europe as exceptionally strong jet stream winds blew in from the Sahara across the Balkans and into both Poland and Ukraine on 10 June. The Polish Institute of Meteorology and Water Management (IMGW) warned of temperature in Poland exceeding 30 °C (86 °F) for the next 5 days, followed by heavy winds, rain storms, thunderstorms and possible flooding especially in the north-west of the country and neighbouring parts of Germany.

12 June saw the temperature of 34 °C (93 °F) in Kyiv registered though the city was previously forecasted to hit the 37 °C (99 °F) mark, breaking the previous Kyiv record that had stood since 1946 (33.3 °C (91.9 °F)). Ukrainian Galicia and the Crimea peninsula also saw temperatures rise sharply.

On 6 July, 3 low pressure areas moved towards and settled near the Black Sea after a week a high pressure in the region's jet stream far northward in its trek through Europe. The Accuweather.com GFS numerical model predicts the same weather for the next week and an even worse heat wave for the week of the Accuweather.com forecast Earlier in June, Minsk hit 30 °C (86 °F) and Kyiv temperature soared to 34 °C (93 °F). Saint Petersburg had yet to see the 30 °C (86 °F) mark.

Heavy storms in Kyiv at the end of 17 July. Temperatures of 30–35 °C (86–95 °F) were registered in almost the whole Ukraine in July, while in the east and in the northeast, they reached 36–39 °C (97–102 °F).

It was revealed on 19 July that 800 Ukrainians, including 115 kids, had drowned since 1 May.

Temperatures began rising again in Ukraine in early August, with 35–40 °C (95–104 °F) being recorded at many central and eastern locations, including the city of Kyiv, in the first week. Wildfires broke out throughout Ukraine late July/early August. According to Ukrainian authorities these fires where not as severe as the 2010 Russian wildfires. A total of 522 fires, including 122 in residential areas were registered on August 11. No wildfires where recorded at Chernobyl during the heatwave., but fires reached the Bryansk region, east of Chernobyl.

On August 6 the Ukrainian Weather Forecasting Center forecasted the heatwave would continue at least until August 18 and probably till the end of August and that extremely high fire risks would remain in Ukraine, apart from western Ukraine. Indeed, a major cool-down did take place on the 18th, with showers and thunderstorms ushering in cooler temperatures (mid-20s°C (mid/late-70s°F)).

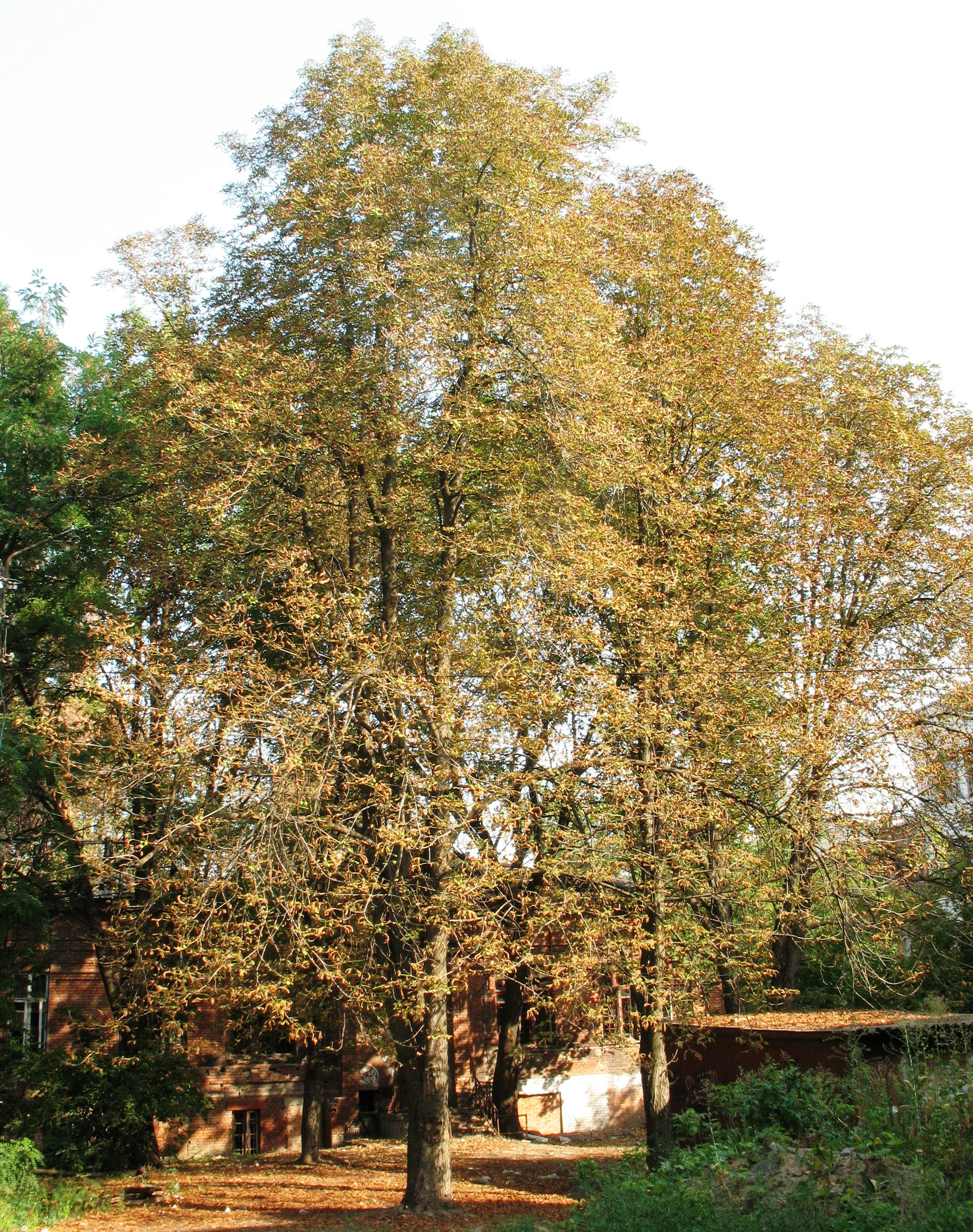
Drought-affected chestnut trees.

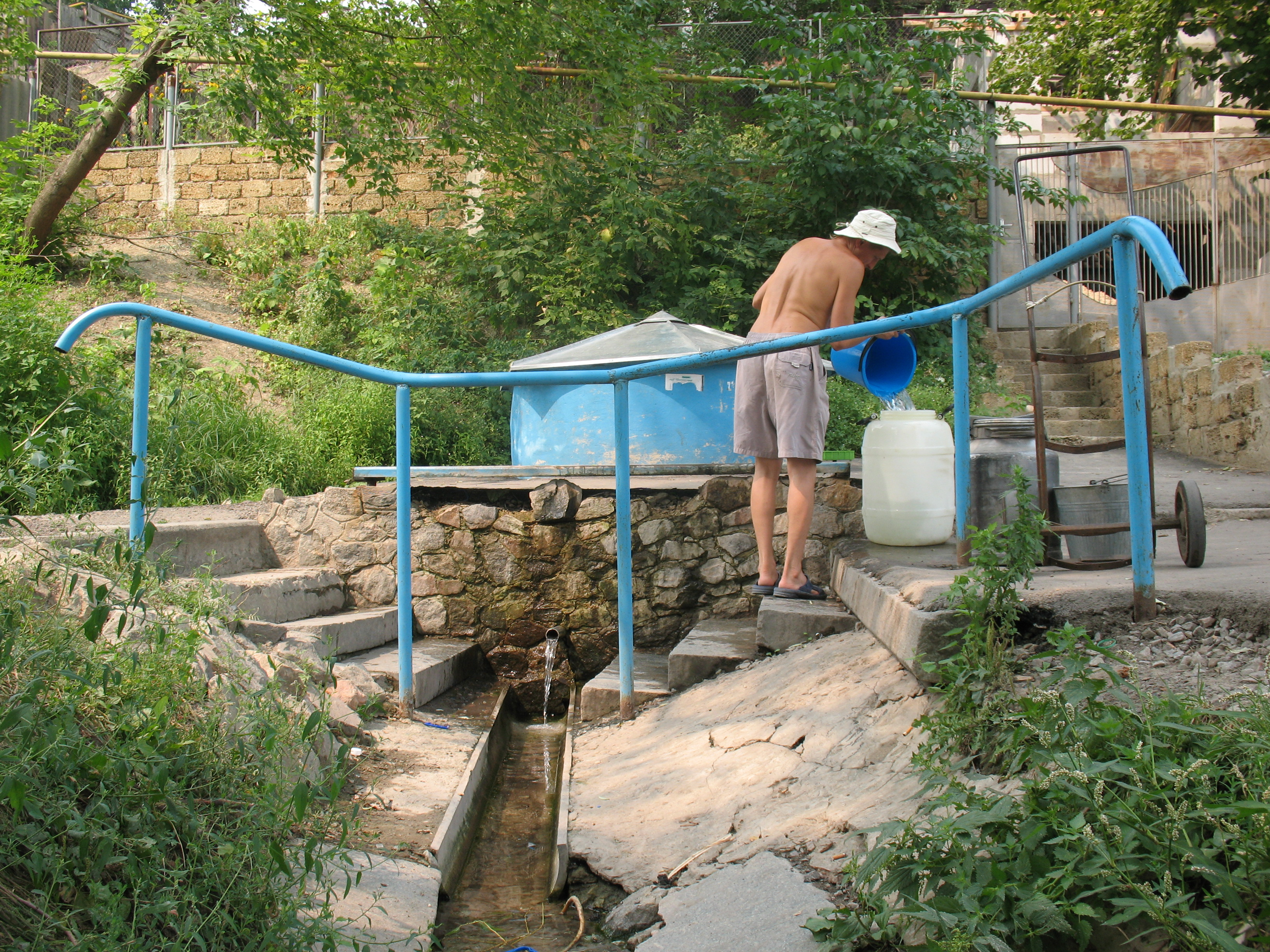
People.

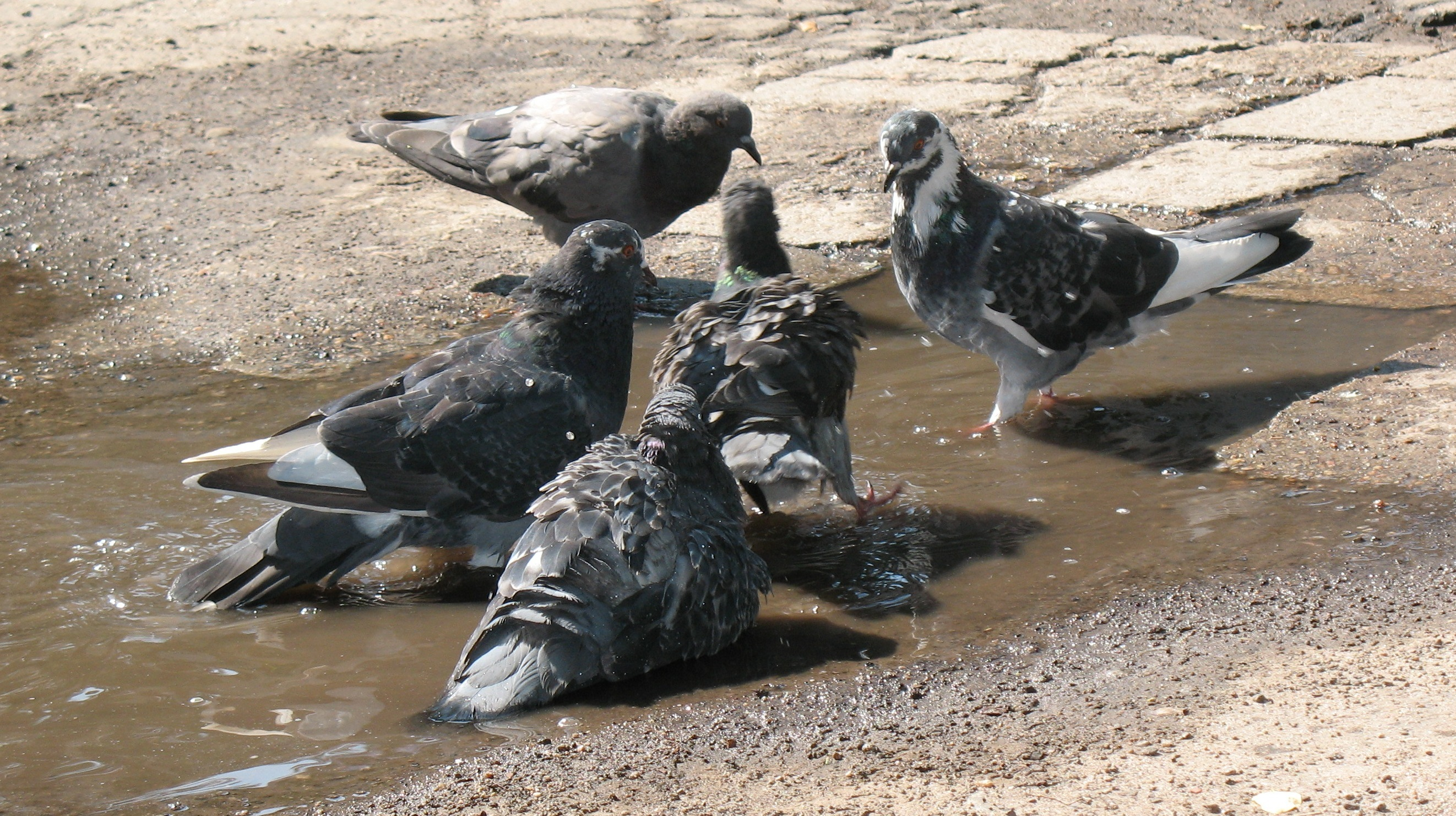
Pigeons cooling off in Kharkiv during 37 °C weather.

==== Turkey ====
Heavy rain falls in the town of Rize, Turkey and along the Turkish/Armenian border on the 15th of July.

=== Asia ===
==== Burma (Myanmar) ====
Myanmar's hottest temperature on record was set on May 12, at 47.2 °C (117.0 °F) in Myinmu, Sagaing Division. The previous hottest temperature record in the country was set in May 1980 at 46.0 °C (114.8 °F) in Magwe, Magwe Division.

==== China ====
Prior to the droughts in Yunnan and Guizhou, the China Meteorological Administration recorded temperatures averaging 2.0 °C (35.6 °F) warmer than normal over six months and half the average precipitation for the past year across the region, both unprecedented since at least the 1950s. By March 22, 2010, about 51 million people faced water shortages in a number of provinces. This drought would soon be replaced by record breaking thunderstorms in late June.

June 27–29 saw the heaviest rain fall in Luolou township in the Chinese Guangxi Zhuang autonomous region in 300 years. 6,673 people were affected; as the town was cut off, schools closed and people travelled by boat.

The heat wave hit China's Liaoning Province and Hubei Province on the 2nd.

The heat wave hit Wuhan city, Hubei Province, Qionghai, Hainan Province, Nanning city, Guangxi Zhuang autonomous region, on July 3. As the hot weather swept most of northern, central and southern China some regions recorded temperatures soaring up to 39 °C (102 °F).

July 5 saw temperatures of 40 °C (104 °F) scorch 16 provinces, autonomous regions and municipalities. The National Meteorological Center (NMC) issued a yellow heat alert to the provinces of Shandong, Anhui, Jiangsu, Gansu, Beijing, Inner Mongolia Autonomous Region, Shaanxi and Shanxi Province on July 5. About 400,000 square kilometres (150,000 mi^{2}), or 37.8%, of Inner Mongolia were hit by drought.

Xingqing Lake, in the Xingqing Palace Park, turned crimson; park spokesman Liang Zibin blamed a mixture of pollutants and high heat for the aquatic phenomena. There were serious problems with green algae in the river surrounding the ancient city of Xi'an. Lakes and rivers turned green and red as a result of algae blooms flourishing in the hot weather, according to the Xinhua news agency.

July 5 saw Beijing set a new highest temperature record at 40.3 °C (104.5 °F). Near record heat waves hit both Gansu Province, Guizhou and Inner Mongolia on the 5th.

A yellow-level heat alert was issued in the provinces of Guangdong and Hainan as well as Guangxi Zhuang Autonomous Region, due to predicted temperatures of 35 to 38 °C (95 to 100 °F) on July 5.

Bajin, Macau and Hong Kong witnessed a heavy spike in temperatures on the 7th.

Temperatures in Sichuan and Quzhou rose sharply to 35 °C (95 °F) as the average heat wave temperature of 13 of China's provinces and regions reached over 35 °C. A record temperature of 41.8 °C (107.2 °F) hit Beijing on the 7th and were predicted to reach 40 °C (104 °F) on the 8th.

On 7 July, five people died and eight were missing after torrential rains caused flash floods in Huangyuan County, in China's overheating Qinghai Province, according to local government sources. Rumours that a homeless old man had also been crushed to death in a partly collapsed house were denied by rescue workers.

July 8 saw the highest temperature and heavy rain storms across the People's Republic of China so far. China's National Meteorological Centre (NMC) predicted that temperatures would fall by the 9th. Local authorities and the NMC also issued an orange flood alert in central and southwest China were put on flood alert and the worst floods for 40 years hit the regions.

Heavy rains hit Hubei and Anhui provinces on July 8 and caused a 1 meter deep flood which killed 1 person and made 500,000 homeless. The storm moved southeastward over the next day, helping to dissipate the local heat wave.

Forest fires hit parts of Qinghai Province on July 20.

There was a forest fire in the Greater Hinggan Mountains of Heilongjiang Province according to Sun Xiguo, director of the fire control headquarters of Greater Hinggan Mountains. More than 7,000 people in Heilongjiang and another 3,000 from Inner Mongolia battled the fires as the province's ground temperature had been as high as 50 °C (122 °F) on August 4.

==== India ====
One of the hottest seasons on record was recorded in India through May, prior to the monsoon season. At least 250 people died from the heat wave in the country. The 2010 Indian heatwave is a period of ongoing extremely hot weather occurring during the summer of 2010 in India and much of South Asia. Temperatures of 53.7 °C (128.7 °F) have been recorded in Pakistan. Said to be the harshest summer since 1800, the heat wave has killed hundreds of people due to heat exhaustion and food poisoning

==== Japan ====
The summer of 2010 was the hottest since Japan began keeping records. Major Japanese cities recorded their highest temperatures between July 15 and September 6.

According to the Japan Meteorological Agency (JMA)'s confirmed report, major Japanese cities on average, were at their highest level of hot temperatures, in August 2010. Fukuoka, Kyushu, Fukuyama, Hiroshima, Hirakata, Osaka, Hiroshima, Kyoto, Okayama, Osaka and Takamatsu, Shikoku were all above 30 °C (86 °F) average temperatures in August that year. And low temperatures in 25 °C (77 °F) day are: 50 days in Tokyo, 49 days in Osaka, 48 days in Takamatsu, 47 days in Fukuoka, Hiroshima and Nagoya, 43 days in Kanazawa, 40 days in Yonago and 38 days in Niigata, all during same period. Following the above, 35 °C (95 °F) high temperature days are: 37 days in Kumagaya, Saitama, 33 days in Kyoto and Isesaki, Gunma, 31 days in Tokai, Aichi, 29 days in Tottori, Kofu, Yamanashi and Nishiwaki, Hyogo, 25 days in Osaka and 24 days in Hiroshima, all during same period.

According to the Ministry of Health, Labour and Welfare of Japan, a record of 1,718 people died from heat stroke.

==== Mongolia ====
An extreme heat wave hit Mongolia on June 23 with the temperature reaching as much as 41 °C (106 °F) in some places. The drought and heat wave combined to make wild fires inevitable. At the time, 73 wild fires had already been registered in the country, with four more erupting on July 4. The Khentii Mountains were hit hard, with Khentii Province overheating and the Khan Khentii Strictly Protected Area facing a possible drought on the 5th.

Officials claimed the forest fires of the 6th were caused by the heat wave and drought. The fires killed 3 people, injured 6, killed 936 head of livestock and caused about 910 million Tugrig (U.S. $670,000) in damages, officials said. About 984 fire-fighters, 164 border guards and 2,022 locals fought the bushfires.

The fires started in Selenge Province and then Tov Province on the 6th, but had spread to another 12 aimags (provinces) by the 7th, according to the head of the fire department of the general emergency management authority. The emergency authority said they wanted people to stay out of the danger zones unless they were fighting the fires and called upon the public for more volunteer firefighters. July 7 saw even more bush fires in the already burning counties.

==== Pakistan ====
Temperatures soared to 53.5 °C (128.3 °F) in Mohen-jo-Daro on May 26, and twelve cities in Pakistan saw temperatures above 50 °C (122 °F). The previous record for Pakistan, and for all of Asia, was reached at 52.8 °C (127.0 °F) in Sindh Province on June 12, 1919. By May 27, the temperatures higher than 45 °C (113 °F) hit many areas across the country, at least 18 people died in Pakistan.

==== Vietnam ====
Hanoi was hit by a heat wave from June 29 to July 2. Daytime temperatures were between 40 and 35 °C (104 and 95 °F), while night time temperatures were 30 °C (86 °F). Droughts and power cut were an imminent threat in the north of Vietnam.

=== The Middle East ===
There were numerous heat records broken in the Middle east as well, such as in Bahrain, where the country set its hottest June temperature on record at 46.9 °C (116.4 °F) on June 20. There was also plenty of heat in Iraq, where a new unofficial hottest temperature record was set on June 14, 2010, at 52.0 °C (125.6 °F) in Basra. The previous record was 51.7 °C (125.1 °F) on August 8, 1937, in Ash Shu'ayba.

On July 26 the heat reached near-record levels over Iraq.

In Israel, the year 2010 was the hottest on record, and average temperatures were 2–3 °C (3.6–5.4 °F) higher than the average. The temperature in Kibbutz Almog, near the Dead Sea, on August 7 was 51.4 °C (124.5 °F). The temperature was the hottest measured in 68 years. The summer lasted till December, when a severe storm hit the Israeli shore, with waves rising up to 14 metres (46 ft) in height and 70–220 millimetres (2.8–8.7 in) fell in 3 days as well as 1–2 metres (3.3–6.6 ft) of snow on Mount Hermon.

The temperature nearly break the record of July 2000, in Marka (civil/mil airport) Amman, where temperatures reached 42.22 °C (108.00 °F) according to the METAR recording at the mentioned airport, adding that temperatures were nudging the 40 °C (104 °F) in many consecutive days, and actually went beyond it.

By August 20, another intense heat wave arrived, and broke the previously mentioned record in Marka airport, and the temperatures reached 43.5 °C. The temperature in Tela' Al-Ali/Sweileh, Madaba, Anjara/Ajloun, reached 42.3 °C.

In Kuwait, the temperature in Mitribah reached 54.4 °C on June 15 which was the highest temperature ever recorded in Asia, and is 2 degrees lower than the world record for Death Valley, USA of 56.7 °C degrees. In August 2010, the heat index reached 64 °C at Al-Nuwaiseeb due to the high humidity.

On July 26 the heat reached near-record levels over Kuwait.

On July 14, the highest temperature in Qatar reached 50.4 °C (122.7 °F).

The heat wave hit Saudi Arabia in June, setting an unofficial all-time temperature record on June 22, at 52.0 °C (125.6 °F), breaking the previous record of 51.7 °C (125.1 °F). The heat wave also caused sand storms to occur, causing a blackout after eight power plants in the country were knocked offline.

In addition to the heat, Lebanon has been through the worst drought ever since 1931 – the temperatures reached 47.6 °C (117.7 °F) in the coast and 37 °C (99 °F) in the Beqaa Valley. And the summer unusually prolonged until 5 December. The spring started pretty early that year, after passing through a stormy January with no snow, which only fall on 21 January and lasted until the last days of February.

There were several rain events, however, such as when Heavy rain fell in most of East Azarbaijan Province and West Azarbaijan Province on the 14th of July.

Heavy rain and thunder storms also hit the town of Samail in Oman's northern, coastal mountain range on July 14.

=== North Africa ===
==== North Africa in general ====
Niamey, Niger took in refugees from Tillabéri Department 12 days before, after they turned up hoping the city would help them. The towns of Kongomé, Zinder, Tanout and Dalli were the worst hit by the drought by May 3.

Dehydration was reported to have killed 1 person in Niger, while others in the region were at risk of water shortages on June 1.

A new heat wave hit Niger on June 21, causing an increased area of drought; causing crop failure and the threat of widespread famine.

In Chad, the temperature reached 47.6 °C (117.7 °F) on June 22 in Faya-Largeau, breaking a record set in 1961. Sudan reached 49.7 °C (121.5 °F) in Dongola the same day, breaking a record set in 1987. Niger broke its own record set in 1998 the next day at 48.2 °C (118.8 °F) in Bilma.

Three years of famine and more recent sandstorms devastated Niger on July 14, prompting the new military junta to appeal for international food aid.

On July 24, the British Red Cross flew its logistics teams to Niger to help the army and local officials with transportation. The relief effort has already been made possible by the response to the Red Cross's West Africa Crisis Appeal which aims to raise £500,000. According to UN agencies, 200,000 children need treatment for malnutrition in Niger alone, as Oxfam puts out an £7,000,000 appeal to cover both the Chad and Niger.

France sends food and cash aid to Mali on July 25.

On July 26 the heat reached near-record levels over Chad and Niger, and about 20 had reportedly died in northern Niger of dehydration on July 27.

On August 1, Gadabeji, Niger suffered 35 °C (95 °F) heat and drought. The exceptionally heavy rainfall of 2009 destroyed crops and devastated the year's harvest. The resulting fall in production in staples like maize, millet and sorghum affected much of West Africa's fragile Sahel, including neighbouring Chad and northern Nigeria.

August 3 had Burkina Faso hit by a drought, as 4,500,000 Burkinans and 6,700,000 Nigeriens faced starvation.

==== Mauritania, Senegal and Mali ====
On May 12 and 26, Mauritania, the Sénégal River Area, and neighbouring parts of both Senegal and Mali faced both a drought and famine.

Seven people died in Ghaidi Magha, Mauritania, near the Malian border on May 18.

==== Morocco and Algeria ====
The heat wave that left an overheating Morocco for the Iberian Peninsula on July 11 was attributed to the regional hot air currents that depart from the Sahara desert in Northern Africa at about 1,000 meters in altitude, which facilitated a movement in the hot air towards the Balkans and Ukraine via the Straits of Gibraltar, Spain and Italy. Unusually hot weather was also reported in parts of Algeria on the 11th.

==== Sudan ====
Sudan all recorded their hottest all-time temperatures on record on June 22 and June 23, hitting the mid 40s Celsius (low 110s Fahrenehit) in places.

=== North America ===
==== United States ====
New York City saw their record earliest first reading at or above 90 °F (32 °C), on April 7. Boston also saw their first temperature at or above 90 that day.

In Frederick, Maryland, the temperature reached 106 °F (41 °C) in early July. Power outages in New York and in Southern Ontario were reported to have been caused by the heatwave.

June 24 saw a high pressure zone settle between North Carolina and Bermuda. A two-day-long heat wave hit the more rural parts of Texas on July 1.

From July 4 to July 9, 2010, the majority of the American East Coast, from the Carolinas to Maine, was gripped in a severe heat wave. Both Philadelphia and New York City, as well as Baltimore, Washington, Raleigh, and Boston, eclipsed 100 °F (38 °C). Many records were broken, some of which dated back to the 19th century, including Wilmington, Delaware's temperature of 103 °F (39 °C) on Wednesday, July 7, which broke the record of 97 °F (36 °C) from 1897. Philadelphia and New York eclipsed 100 °F (38 °C) for the first time since 2001. Frederick, Maryland and Newark, New Jersey, among others, exceeded 100 °F (38 °C) for four days in a row.

Cleveland, Ohio, was rising into the upper 90s on July 8. Meanwhile, various authorities on the U.S. Eastern Seaboard issued extreme heat alerts, with the temperature being forecast to rise well beyond 30 °C (86 °F) in some areas on the 5th.

The American northeast was severely affected as New York City saw a record temperature of 103 °F (39 °C) on July 6, and the heat hit 100.4 °F (38.0 °C) in Boston, and 40.6 °C (105.1 °F) in Baltimore on the same day, breaking the standing Baltimore record from 1983. Hartford, Connecticut tied their all time heat record that day.

New York City saw temperatures as high as 35 °C (95 °F) in some areas and it was predicted to reach 38 °C (100 °F) the next day. A report released by The Wall Street Journal on July 7 stated that June saw sales rise over the Independence Day holiday, especially along the East Coast of America. By July 3, retail sales had risen by 3.9% from the year-ago period and 1% over the previous week, according to the International Council of Shopping Centers and Goldman Sachs and Johnson Redbook Research also showed a sales gain in the final week of June, citing the hot weather.

Both the American East Coast and parts of the American Midwest had record high temperatures, killing two people on the 8th. Authorities in Washington, D.C., New York City, Maine, Ottawa, Montreal and Toronto issued safety advice to its residents.

Several power outages across the United States occurred due to increased demand, and also a transformer fire; lack of air conditioning led to the death of an elderly Philadelphia man and a homeless woman in Detroit. Canadian media outlets also stated that there had been a large increase of people visiting hospital during the heat wave, such as Montfort Hospital, which reported 158 patients in one day.

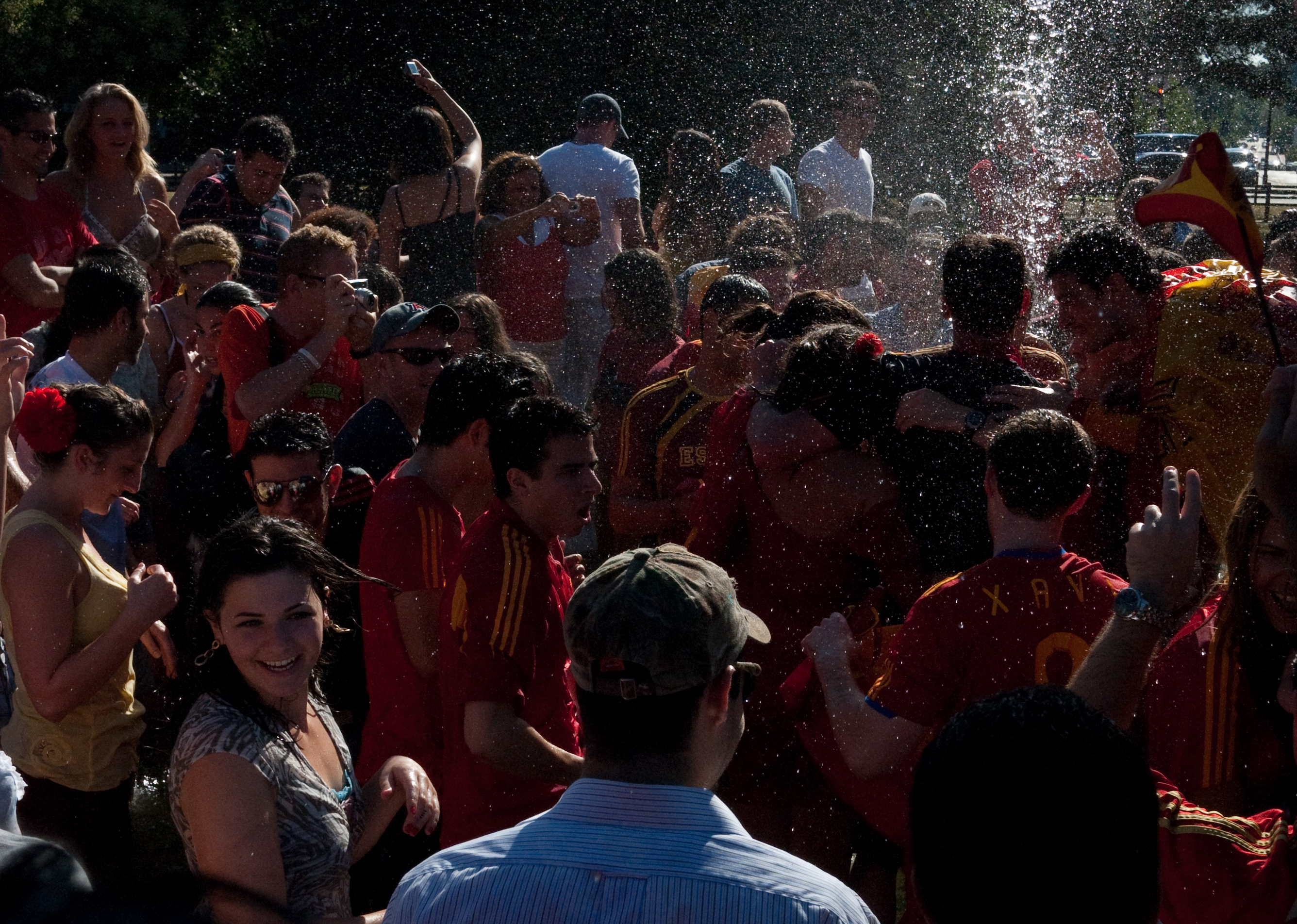
2010 FIFA World Cup revelers in Washington DC cool off in a fountain

The Associated Press reported that "the hot weather was blamed for the deaths of 89-year-old Edward Pilch in Whitehall, PA, and a 46-year-old woman in Queens." The heat also caused rail disruptions in Washington after the metal track expanded and could not be contained by the dampers.

The BBC stated that electricity providers were "urging consumers to cut back on energy use to relieve the stress on the power system ... in Philadelphia alone, 8,000 people lost power due to increased demand on Tuesday [6th July]" News agencies stated that people had been staying in air-conditioned churches to avoid the heat. Consolidated Edison sent out dry ice to customers with no electricity.

The U.S. East Coast and parts of the Midwest saw temperatures reaching up to 100 °F (38 °C) on July 11. The electricity grid in New York City was near collapse as Consolidated Edison cut electricity to air conditioning units and 20,000 homes and businesses to ease the burden on its failing system, according to The New York Times. Various utilities urged customers to use less electricity as the aging power grid began to falter under the heat wave that ran from Virginia to Maine via New York. About 375,400 customers in the New York City neighborhoods of Flushing, Gowanus, Forest Hills and Brooklyn Heights were victims of limited power outages in New York on July 11.

For the Midwest became more related to the extreme high humidity, above normal rainfall from thunderstorms across much of Iowa, Wisconsin, Nebraska and Illinois in the previous month leading up to the heat wave caused dew points to soar; in Newton, Iowa, where temperatures had been in the mid-90s F, the dew point reached 88 °F (31 °C) on July 14, one of the highest ever recorded in the United States. The heat index reached 128 °F (53 °C) in Newton, Chicago's dew point of 83 °F (28 °C), matching readings from the 1995 heat wave that caused many deaths. Omaha, Des Moines and St. Louis also experienced high humidity levels.

Manitoba and several states in the Central U.S. had heavy thunderstorms with a severe tornado hitting Northfield, Minnesota, on July 16. The heat wave ended in most of Canada and was reduced by thunderstorms in much of the United States.

The heat continued through the second half of July but extreme heat was mostly confined to the Southeastern United States, giving relief to the Northeast and Upper Midwest as it had early in the month. The intense heat build-up again occurred over much of Plains states, Upper South and Lower Midwest; temperatures surpassed 104 °F (40 °C) in many locations. By August 3, the temperature in Wichita, Kansas, reached 109 °F (43 °C). Washington, DC had temperatures that surpassed 98 °F (37 °C) on 11 days during the summer of 2010, reaching a peak of 102 °F (39 °C) on July 6 and 7.

By late July, the morgue in Pima County, Arizona, had become overwhelmed with over 300 bodies; of those, 57 deaths were attributed to immigrants crossing the Mexico – United States border, overwhelmed by the July heat. All of this gave New York City their warmest summer ever, with a mean temperature of 77.8 °F (25.4 °C).

The heat wave was initially absent in the Western United States, where an unusually cool summer took place. However, this cool trend ended in the last week of September (beginning on Sunday, September 26, 2010), when 4 powerful anticyclones stalled in the Gulf of Alaska, over the Southern United States (especially Texas), over the Western United States (specifically over Northwestern Utah). However, before then, parts of Montana and parts of California saw slightly above-average temperatures on July 6. But beginning on September 26, the heatwave began to impact Western North America, along with the entire Western United States. On September 27, Los Angeles broke its all-time record high, recording a temperature of 113 °F (45 °C) in downtown Los Angeles, along with San Diego County, with a new record high temperature of 112 °F (44 °C). The Southwestern United States had near high temperatures from September 26 to October 2, and even hotter than that in some regions. The Western United States also experienced record high/near record high temperatures from late September to mid-October. By the end of October, temperatures within the United States returned to near-average, as the anticyclones weakened and then dissipated.

== See also ==
- Cold wave
- Cyclone Phet
- Drought
- El Niño-Southern Oscillation
- Global warming
- Heat burst
- List of severe weather phenomena
- Urban heat island
- 2010 Pakistan floods
- 2010 Russian wildfires
- 2010 Bolivia forest fires
- 2010 China drought and dust storms
- 2010 Romanian floods
- 2010 China floods
- 2010 Pakistan floods
- 2010 eruptions of Eyjafjallajökull
- 2010 Western Australian storms in Earth's Southern Hemisphere
- 2010 Victorian storms in Australia
- Tornadoes of 2010
- Global storm activity of 2010
- Global storm activity of 2009
- 2003 European heat wave
