= Tierra de Badajoz =

Coordinates: 38°52′59″N 6°58′00″W

- Comarca
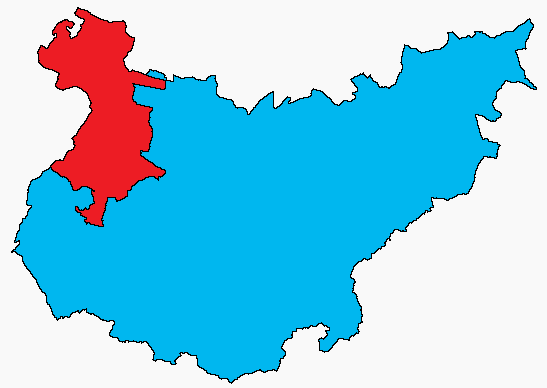
- Location in the province of Badajoz
- Country: Spain
- Autonomous community: Extremadura
- Province: Badajoz
- Capital: Badajoz
- Municipalities: List: Alburquerque, Badajoz, La Albuera, La Codosera, Pueblonuevo del Guadiana, San Vicente de Alcántara, Talavera la Real, Valdelacalzada, Villar del Rey

Area
  - Total: 2,788.25 km^{2} (1,076.55 sq mi)

Population
  - Total: 176,871
  - Density: 63.4344/km^{2} (164.294/sq mi)
- Time zone: UTC+1 (CET)
  - Summer (DST): UTC+2 (CEST)
- Largest municipality: Badajoz

Tierra de Badajoz is a comarca in the province of Badajoz in the autonomous community of Extremadura, western Spain. The majority of its population, amounting to around 177,000 inhabitants, lives in the capital, the municipality of Badajoz, and the immediate surrounding area.

== Geography ==
=== Location ===
The comarca is situated in the northwestern part of the province, bordering to the north with the neighbouring province of Cáceres. It borders Portugal to the west, Tierra de Mérida - Vegas Bajas to the east, and Llanos de Olivenza and Tierra de Barros to the south.

=== Municipalities ===
- Alburquerque
- Badajoz
- La Albuera
- La Codosera
- Guadiana del Caudillo
- Pueblonuevo del Guadiana
- San Vicente de Alcántara
- Talavera la Real
- Valdelacalzada
- Villar del Rey
