= Tierra de Mérida - Vegas Bajas =

Tierra de Badajoz
- Comarca
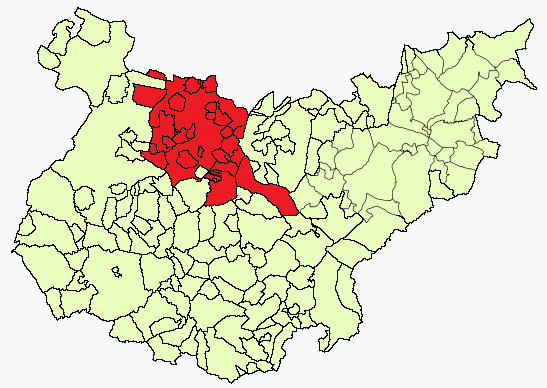
- Location in the province of Badajoz
- Coordinates: 38°54′18″N 6°22′4″W
- Country: Spain
- Autonomous community: Extremadura
- Province: Badajoz

Area
  - Total: 2,216 km^{2} (856 sq mi)

Population (2015)
  - Total: 131,154
  - Density: 59.19/km^{2} (153.3/sq mi)
- Time zone: UTC+1 (CET)
  - Summer (DST): UTC+2 (CEST)

Tierra de Mérida - Vegas Bajas is a comarca in the province of Badajoz, Extremadura, Spain. It contains the following municipalities:

- Alange
- Aljucén
- Arroyo de San Serván
- Calamonte
- Carmonita
- Cordobilla de Lácara
- Don Álvaro
- El Carrascalejo
- Esparragalejo
- Guadiana del Caudillo
- La Garrovilla
- La Nava de Santiago
- La Roca de la Sierra
- La Zarza
- Lobón
- Mérida
- Mirandilla
- Montijo
- Oliva de Mérida
- Puebla de la Calzada
- Puebla de Obando
- San Pedro de Mérida
- Torremayor
- Trujillanos
- Valdelacalzada
- Valverde de Mérida
- Villagonzalo
