= María Josefa Cerrato Rodríguez =

María Josefa de los Reyes Cerrato Rodríguez
- Born: 6 January 1897; Arroyo de San Serván
- Died: 30 April 1981 (aged 84); Calamonte
- Occupation: vet
- Children: three

María Josefa de los Reyes Cerrato Rodríguez (6 January 1897 – 30 April 1981) was the first Spanish woman to qualify as a veterinarian.

== Life ==
Rodríguez was born in Arroyo de San Serván in 1897. Her parents were Maximialiano González and Nazaria Morilla. Her family had always included vets but when her father retired their family would have no vet. Women were not allowed to enrol on veterinary courses so she had to request special permission.

She studied pharmacy and a veterinary degree. She obtained a degree in 1925 but continued to study. She was not the first Spanish woman to start to become a vet, but she was the first to complete the training and to qualify.

She married Ignacio Barrientos and had three daughters in León.

Rodríguez died in Calamonte in 1981.
