= Pueblonuevo del Guadiana =

- Municipality
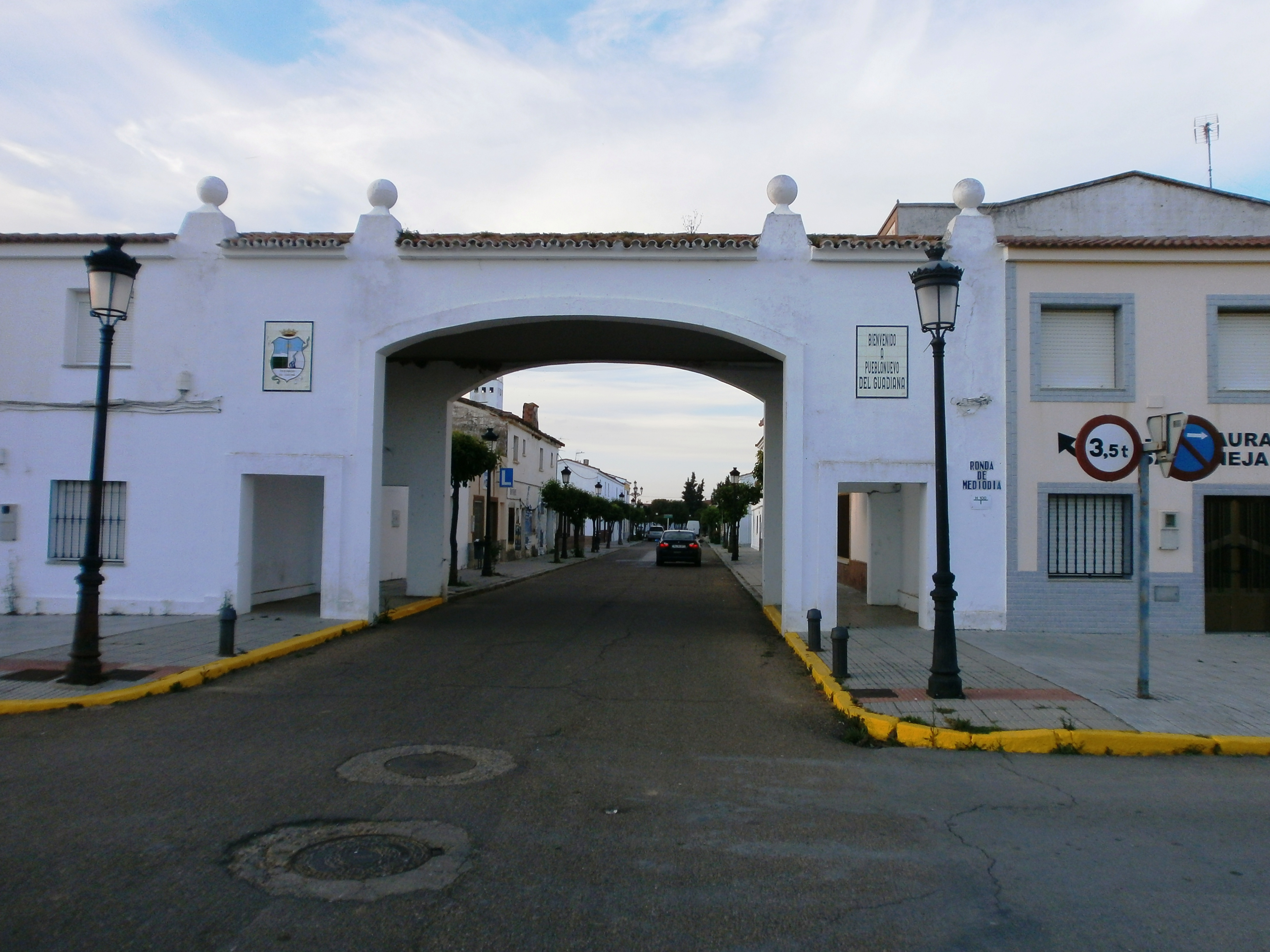
- Main entrance of the town

- Coat of arms

- Location in Extremadura Location in Iberia
- Coordinates: 38°55′24″N 6°45′20″W
- Country: Spain
- Community: Extremadura
- Province: Badajoz
- Comarca: Tierra de Badajoz

Government
  - Mayor: Pedro Pablo González Merino (PP, since 2015)

Area
  - Total: 30.95 km^{2} (11.95 sq mi)
- Elevation: 180 m (590 ft)

Population (2025-01-01)
  - Total: 1,955
  - Density: 63.17/km^{2} (163.6/sq mi)
- Demonym: Pueblonuvense
- Postal code: 06184
- Website: Official website

Pueblonuevo del Guadiana, also shortened as Pueblonuevo, is a Spanish town and municipality in the province of Badajoz, Extremadura. It has a population of 2,046 and an area of 30.95 km^{2} (11.95 sq mi).

== History ==
The town is a planned community founded in 1948, as achievement of the Plan Badajoz, and officially inaugurated in 1956 by Francisco Franco. It was one of the villages founded by the Instituto Nacional de Colonización during the Francoist Spain.

== Geography ==
Pueblonuevo is located between the cities of Badajoz (24 km [15 mi] west) and Mérida (37 km [23 mi] east), and next to the Spanish border with Portugal (40 km [25 mi] west of Elvas). It lies on a plain, rich in canals and rural lands, between the rivers Alcazaba and Guadiana.

The municipality is part of the Judicial district of Badajoz, has no hamlets, and borders with Badajoz, Valdelacalzada and Talavera la Real. Nearest settlements are Alcazaba, Novelda del Guadiana, Guadiana del Caudillo, Talavera la Real, Balboa, Valdelacalzada and Villafranco del Guadiana.

== Main sights ==
One of the sights of the town is the Catholic church dedicated to Christ the King (Iglesia del Cristo Rey), belonging to the Archdiocese of Mérida-Badajoz.

== Transport ==
Pueblonuevo is crossed to the north by the Ciudad Real-Mérida-Badajoz railway, part of an international line that links Madrid with Lisbon. It is crossed to the south by the regional road EX-209, and is 13 km (8.1 mi) from Badajoz Airport. Nearest motorway exit is "Talavera la Real", on the Autovía A-5 Madrid-Badajoz, and is 8 km (5.0 mi) away.

== Twin towns ==
- Descartes, France

== See also ==
- List of municipalities in Badajoz
