= Guadiana, Badajoz =

Guadiana Guadiana
- Municipality
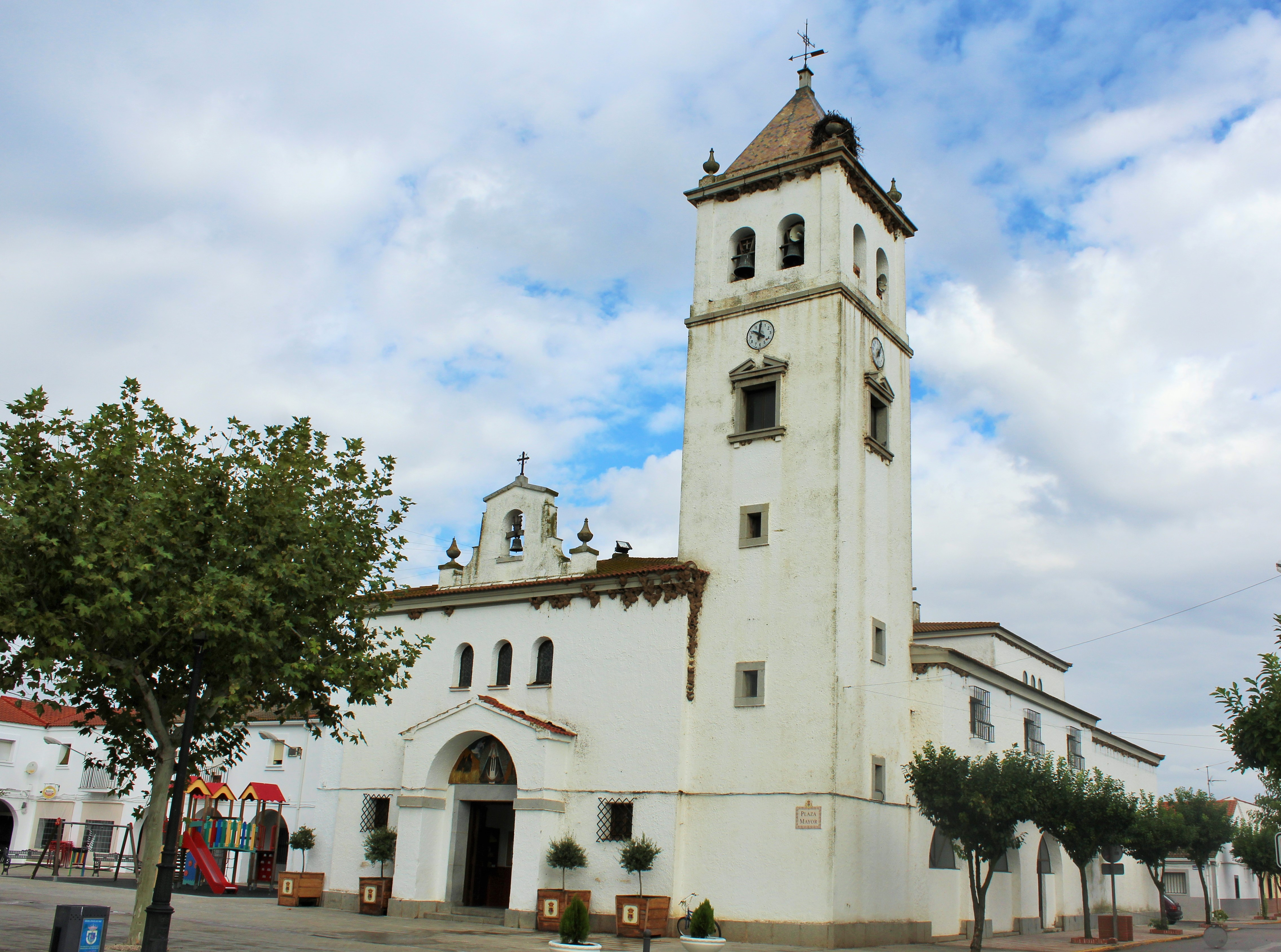
- Parish church

- Flag Coat of arms

- Location in Extremadura
- Coordinates: 38°55′49″N 6°41′27″W
- Country: Spain
- Community: Extremadura
- Province: Badajoz
- Comarca: Tierra de Badajoz

Government
  - Mayor: Antonio Pozo Pitel (PP, since 2023)

Area
  - Total: 30.05 km^{2} (11.60 sq mi)
- Elevation: 185 m (607 ft)

Population (2025-01-01)
  - Total: 2,444
  - Density: 81.33/km^{2} (210.6/sq mi)
- Demonym: Guadianero/a
- Postal code: 06186
- Website: Official website

Guadiana (until 2020 Guadiana del Caudillo), is a Spanish town and municipality of the Province of Badajoz, in the autonomous community of Extremadura. The municipality covers an area of 30.05 square kilometres (11.60 sq mi) and as of 2015 had a population of 2,527 people.

== History ==
The town is a planned community founded in 1949 and officially inaugurated in 1951, and officially became a municipality on 17 February 2012. Named after the nearby river Guadiana and after Francisco Franco, also known as Caudillo, it was one of the villages founded by the Instituto Nacional de Colonización during the Francoist Spain.

Hamlet of Badajoz municipality since its foundation, in 1971 it was constituted as local minor entity (Entidad local menor) and, after the approval of Badajoz City Council (February 2009), it became an independent municipality from 17 February 2012. One month later, on March 11, it was held a referendum to remove the Francoist reference (Caudillo) from the toponym. The left parties of PSOE and Izquerda Unida, following the Historical Memory Law, called for abstention considering the name illegal. With the abstention of 67.7%, 495 votes (60.6%) in favor of the name with del Caudillo and 310 (37.9%) in favor of Guadiana option, the toponym has remained unchanged. The city was finally renamed Guadiana in 2020.

== Geography ==
Located between the cities of Badajoz (32 km west) and Mérida (32 km east), and next to the Spanish borders with Portugal (47 km west of Elvas); Guadiana is, along with La Albuera, an enclave entirely surrounded by the municipal territory of Badajoz.

The municipality is part of the Judicial district of Badajoz and has no hamlets. The town lies on a plain, rich in canals and rural lands, between the rivers Alcazaba and Guadiana. Nearest settlements are Pueblonuevo del Guadiana, Valdelacalzada, Alcazaba, Montijo and Puebla de la Calzada.

== Main sights ==
One of the sights of the town is the Catholic church dedicated to María de la Soledad, belonging to the Archdiocese of Mérida-Badajoz.

== Transport ==
The town is served by a railway station, Estación de Guadiana, on the Ciudad Real-Mérida-Badajoz railway, part of an international line that links Madrid with Lisbon. It is crossed to the south by the regional road EX-209, and is 18 km far from Badajoz Airport. The nearest motorway exit is "Talavera la Real" on the Autovía A-5 Madrid-Badajoz, 14 km away.

== See also ==
- List of municipalities in Badajoz
