= 2010 Romanian floods =

Natural disaster in Moldova, Romania and Ukraine

Meteorological history
- Duration: late June–July 2010

Overall effects
- Fatalities: At least 23 deaths
- Damage: € 65 million (until July 6); 12,237 people affected
- Areas affected: Many counties of Romania; Some counties of Moldova; Chernivtsi Oblast (Ukraine)

The 2010 Romanian floods (Romanian: Inundațiile din iunie 2010 din România) were the result of an extreme weather event that struck Romania in late June 2010. Currently, at least 21 people died. The north-east of the country, especially Suceava County was most affected. Also affected was the Chernivtsi Oblast in neighbouring Ukraine.

== Overview ==
On 29 June 2010, the River Siret threatened to break through the dykes protecting the town of Șendreni, as locals and emergency services reinforced the dykes with sandbags to prevent the river breaking out and flooding the town.

Romanian Prime Minister Emil Boc visited the area, touring Suceava and Botoșani counties, both hard-hit by flooding and still under weather advisories. Officials said hundreds of people have been forced from their homes, dozens of houses have collapsed and hundreds of homes were damaged.

According to an IGSU press release, the storms and flooding affected the counties of Alba, Arad, Bacău, Botoșani, Brașov, Cluj, Hunedoara, Iași, Mehedinți, Neamț, Olt, Prahova, Sălaj, Sibiu, Suceava, Timiș, Tulcea, Vâlcea and Vrancea.

One person in Alba County died and at least 160 people all over the country were evacuated.

Romanian Interior Minister Vasile Blaga said that two people in Cluj County lost their lives.

The north-eastern town of Dorohoi witnessed 6 deaths in the night of June 28–29 as floods rose to just over 1 metre, 3,3 feet in some places. Several roads into Dorohoi remained either washed away or under water. The heavy rain that had been falling for much of the past week in the Balkan country and forecasters have warned that it will continue in northeast Romania until Wednesday morning. The emergency situations spokeswoman Dorina Lupu from Botoșani County said unusually heavy rain had killed 6 people, most in the town of Dorohoi on the 29th.

On July 5, 2010, the Danube in Galați recorded a flow rate of 676 cm (76 cm above the rate of flooding) and a flow of 16,055 m/s. At Șendreni, Siret had a rate of 728 cm (78 cm over the danger level). The local emergency services reinforced the dykes in the afternoon and narrowly averted any more flooding. It was flooded during the July 2010 flood as was its names sake in Galați County.

In Galați, the city was building a dam 1.5 m high, 4.5 km long, with the support of 1,400 military personnel from the Ministry of Administration and Interior and the Ministry of Defence. If the dam breaches, the resulting flood would drown one-quarter of the city, including its shipyard, port and customs office. Nearly 12,000 jobs exist in the area, and about €45 million is lost daily and around €250 million in property losses have been caused by the flooding in Galați.

== Casualties ==
The flooding has affected 1,873 homes and farms, 1,065 hectares of farmland, 1,928 hectares of forest and pasture, two kilometers of national roads, 37 km of county roads, 91 km of communal roads and clogged 424 wells. Authorities say at least 21 people have died and three are missing after heavy rains and flooding in northeastern Romania. Hundreds of people had to be evacuated from their homes, mainly in Suceava and Botoșani counties, close to the Ukrainian border. They spent the night in schools and sports halls or with relatives.

On June 30, 2010, 21 people were killed by the flood in Romania and Ukraine while another 9,500 people were evacuated, according to authorities from both countries. The majority of victims were Romanians; 1 Ukrainian was killed by the flood and 1,083 were evacuated.

== Losses ==
The Romanian Interior Minister Vasile Blaga told parliament that losses were the equivalent to 0.6% GDP. The agriculture ministry has estimated that of 6,700,000 tonnes of wheat for and 2,000,000 hectares of land were by the 30th. Moldova and Ukraine had yet to assess the crisis in their flooded regions.

== Effects ==
Most of the victims drowned when they were trying to escape, while two people were struck by lightning. Three trains were stuck in northeastern Suceava county, due to the flooding of a 50-meter railroad segment. A southwestern customs in Mehedinți County was flooded, and alluvial deposits were reported on two national roads in northeastern Neamț County. Floods spawned by heavy rainfall also affected thousands of acres of pasture and farmland, roads, bridges and power lines in the rural areas in the northeastern part of the country.

== Emergency response ==
Local emergency committees and volunteer emergency services rallied 530 firefighters and 160 volunteers, who took part in damage control efforts. Russia has also delivered 70 tonnes of humanitarian aid to Ukraine in response to the flooding.

== Reaction ==
- (France) French President Nicolas Sarkozy has sent in a letter to Traian Băsescu with his condolences for the victims of floods.

== See also ==
- Global storm activity of 2010
- The Northern Hemisphere Summer heat wave of 2010
