= Șendreni =

- Commune
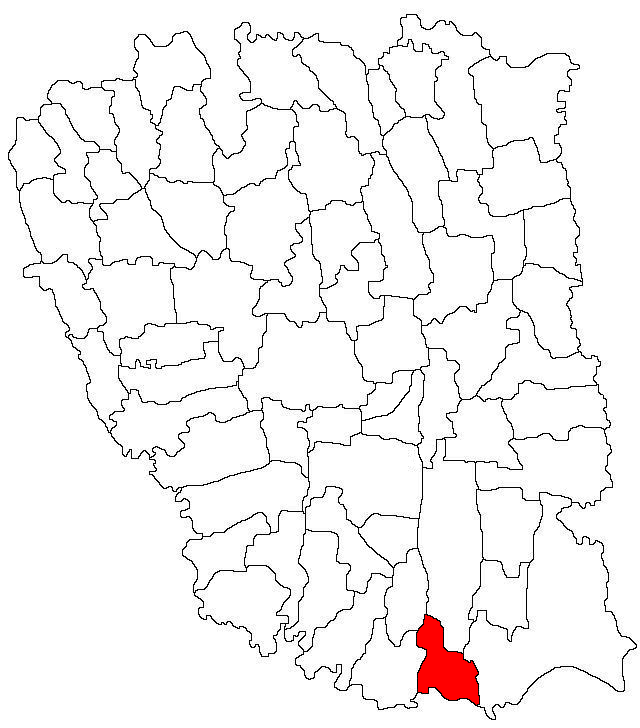
- Location in Galați County

- Location in Romania
- Coordinates: 45°25′N 27°55′E
- Country: Romania
- County: Galați
- Population (2021-12-01): 5,065
- Time zone: EET/EEST (UTC+2/+3)
- Vehicle reg.: GL

Șendreni is a commune in Galați County, Western Moldavia, Romania with a population of 3,102 people. It is composed of three villages: Movileni, Șendreni and Șerbeștii Vechi.

== 2010 floods ==
During July 2010, the River Siret threatened to break through the dykes protecting Șendreni, as locals and emergency services reinforced the dykes with sandbags trucks full of earth to prevent the river breaking out and flooding the commune.

== See also ==
- Global storm activity of 2010
- 2010 Romanian floods
