= San Vicente de Alcántara =

- Municipality
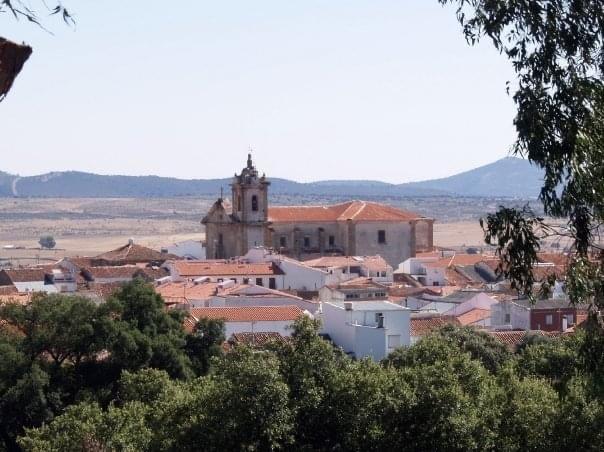

- Coat of arms

- Location in Spain
- Coordinates: 39°21′37″N 7°8′13″W
- Country: Spain
- Autonomous Community: Extremadura
- Province: Badajoz
- Comarca: Tierra de Badajoz

Government
  - Mayor: Andrés Hernáiz de Sixte (PSOE)

Area
  - Total: 275 km^{2} (106 sq mi)
- Elevation (AMSL): 504 m (1,654 ft)

Population (2025-01-01)
  - Total: 5,227
  - Density: 19.0/km^{2} (49.2/sq mi)
- Time zone: UTC+1 (CET)
  - Summer (DST): UTC+2 (CEST (GMT +2))
- Postal code: 06500
- Area code: +34 (Spain) + 924 (Badajoz)
- Website: www.sanvicentedealcantara.es

San Vicente de Alcántara (Spanish pronunciation: [sam biˈθente ðe alˈkantaɾa]) is a municipality in the province of Badajoz, Extremadura, Spain. It has a population of 5,227 and an area of 275 km^{2} (106 sq mi).

== See also ==
- List of municipalities in Badajoz
