= Alange =

- Municipality
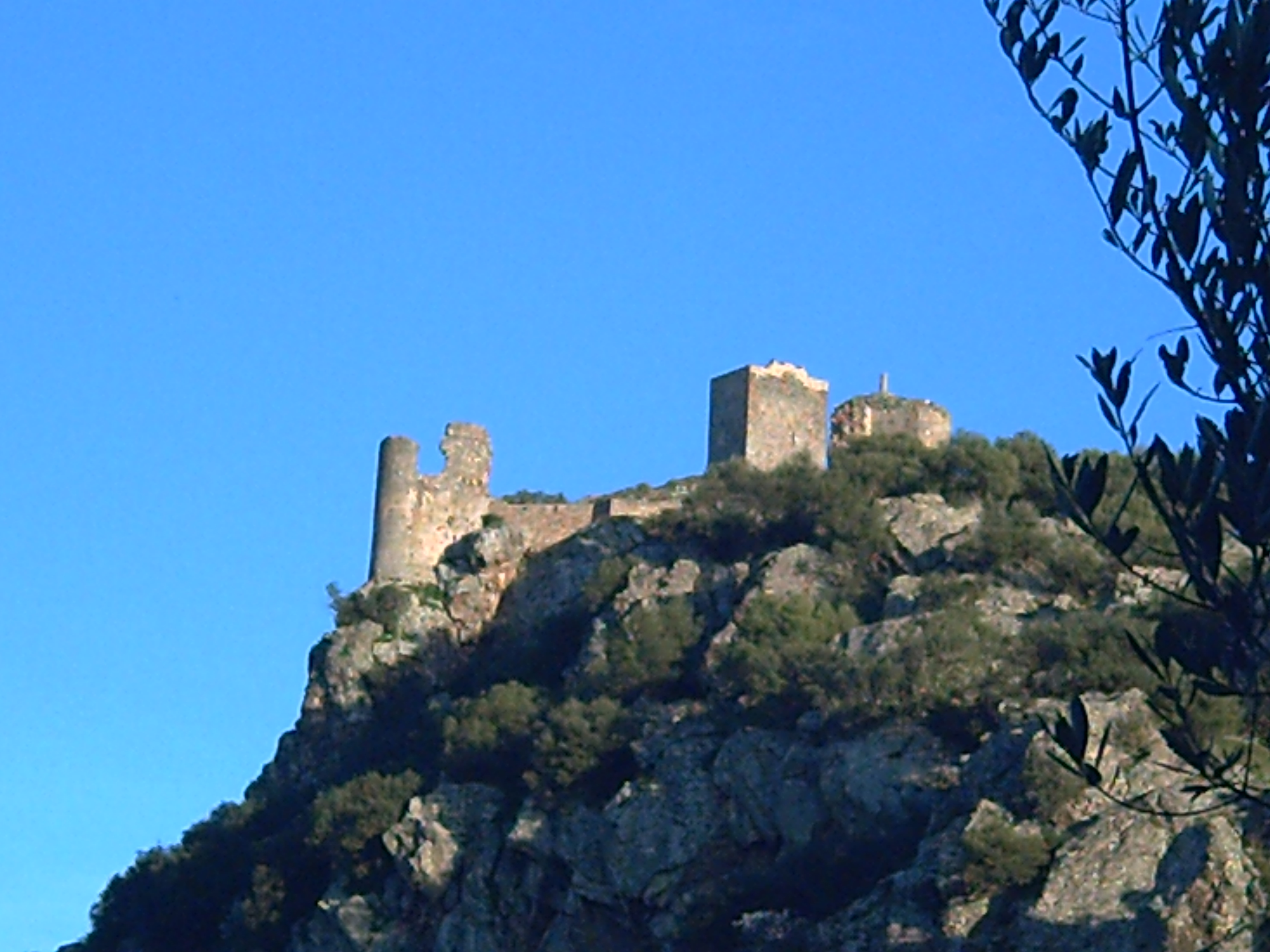
- Castle of Alange.

- Coat of arms

- Location of Alange within Extremadura
- Coordinates: 38°47′09″N 6°14′44″W
- Country: Spain
- Autonomous community: Extremadura
- Province: Badajoz
- Comarca: Tierra de Mérida - Vegas Bajas

Government
  - Mayor: Juan Pulido Gil

Area
  - Total: 160 km^{2} (62 sq mi)
- Elevation: 323 m (1,060 ft)

Population (2025-01-01)
  - Total: 1,802
  - Density: 11/km^{2} (29/sq mi)
- Demonym: Alangeños
- Time zone: UTC+1 (CET)
  - Summer (DST): UTC+2 (CEST)
- Website: Official website

Alange (Spanish pronunciation: [aˈlaŋxe]) is a municipality located in the province of Badajoz, Extremadura, Spain. As of 2017, the municipality has a population of 1,891 inhabitants.

There has been a spa at Alange at least since Roman times when a bathhouse was constructed with separate facilities for men and women.

There is a medieval castle (but of Roman origins), located on a hill commanding the Matachel river. It was held by the Order of Santiago from the 1240s, and was abandoned in 1550.

== See also ==
- List of municipalities in Badajoz
