= La Zarza, Badajoz =

La Zarza
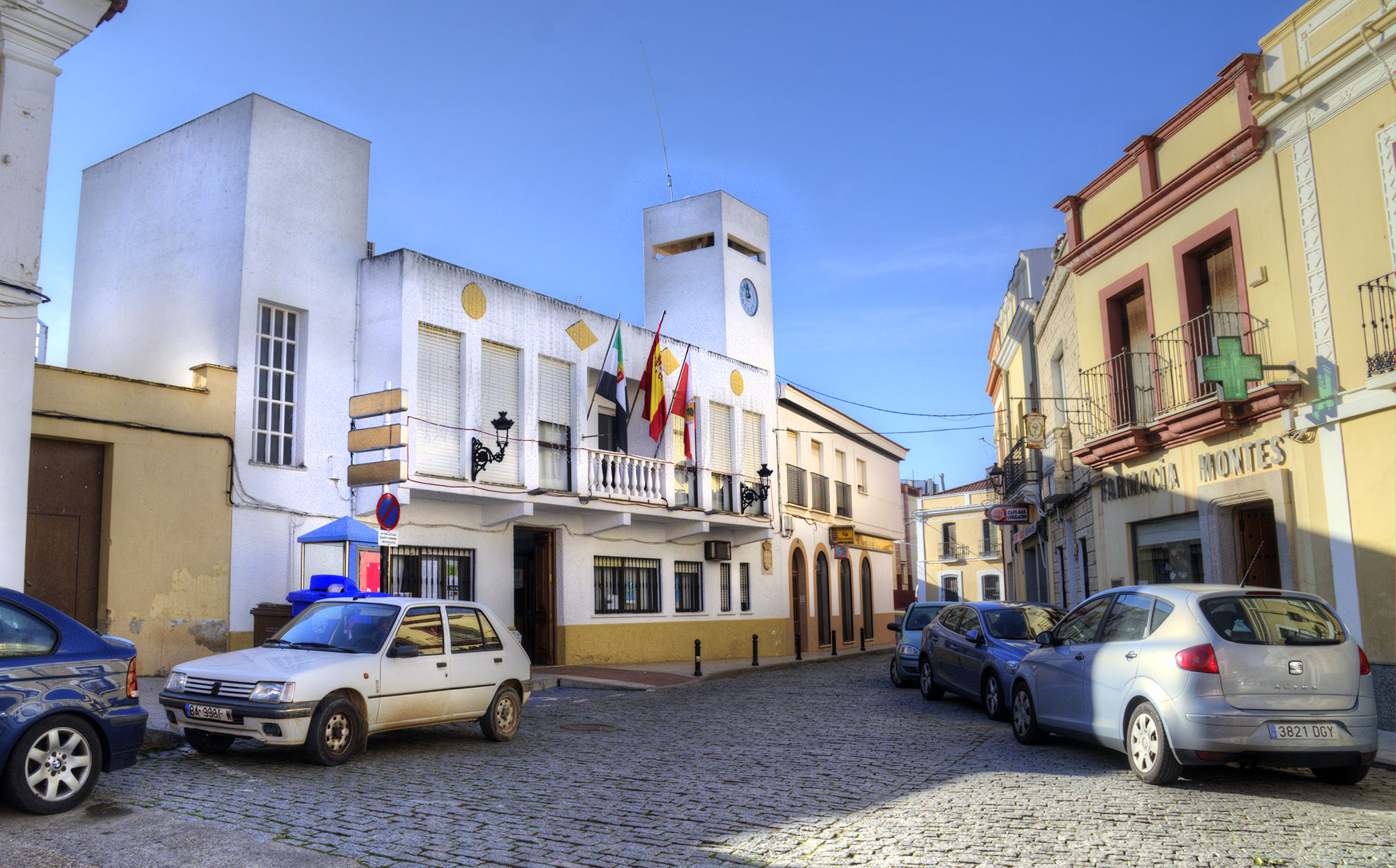

- Flag Coat of arms

- Location in Spain.
- Coordinates: 38°49′5″N 6°13′15″W
- Country: Spain
- Autonomous community: Extremadura
- Province: Badajoz
- Comarca: Tierra de Mérida - Vegas Bajas

Government
  - Mayor: Francisco José Farrona Navas

Area
  - Total: 84 km^{2} (32 sq mi)
- Elevation: 329 m (1,079 ft)

Population (2025-01-01)
  - Total: 3,339
- Time zone: UTC+1 (CET)
  - Summer (DST): UTC+2 (CEST)
- Website: Official website

La Zarza is a Spanish municipality in the province of Badajoz, Extremadura.

== See also ==
- List of municipalities in Badajoz
