= Trujillanos =

Coordinates: 38°57′N 6°15′W

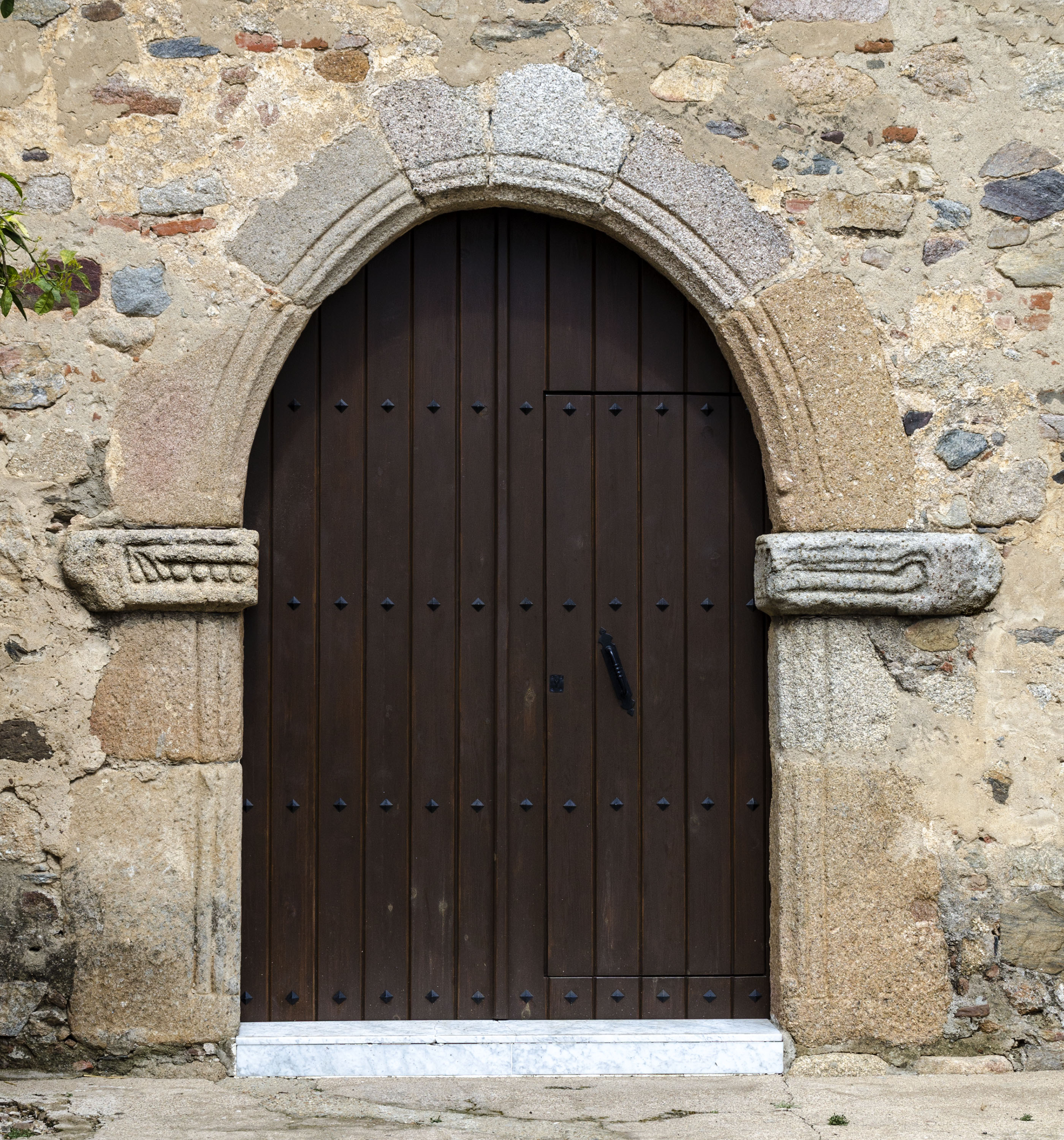

- Coat of arms
- Interactive map of Trujillanos
- Country: Spain
- Autonomous community: Extremadura
- Province: Badajoz
- Comarca: Tierra de Mérida - Vegas Bajas

Government
  - Alcaldesa: Ana María Gómez Valhondo

Area
  - Total: 20.3 km^{2} (7.8 sq mi)
- Elevation: 262 m (860 ft)

Population (2025-01-01)
  - Total: 1,397
- Time zone: UTC+1 (CET)
  - Summer (DST): UTC+2 (CEST)
- Website: Ayuntamiento de Trujillanos

Trujillanos is a Spanish municipality in the province of Badajoz, Extremadura, 9 km from Mérida. It has a population of 1,376 (2020) and an area of 20.3 km^{2}.

== See also ==
- List of municipalities in Badajoz
