= Utta =

Rural locality in Yashkulsky District, Russia

Coordinates: 46°21′54″N 46°00′10″E

Utta (Russian: Утта́; Kalmyk: Удта, Udta) is a rural locality (a selo) in the Yashkulsky District in the Republic of Kalmykia, Russia. Its population is 788 (2010 census); 914 (2002 census); Utta holds the record for the highest temperature measured in Russia, at 45.4 °C (113.7 °F) on 12 July 2010. Utta was controlled by the Wehrmacht during WW2, from August 1942 to December 1942.
