= Esparragalejo Dam =

- Location: Badajoz province, Extremadura, Spain
- Coordinates: 38°56′55.5″N 6°26′18″W
- Opening date: 1st century

Dam and spillways
- Impounds: Albucia (Guadiana basin)
- Height: 5.6 m
- Length: 320.0 m
- Width (base): 2.2 m

The Esparragalejo Dam was a Roman multiple arch buttress dam at Esparragalejo, Badajoz province, Extremadura, Spain. Dating to the 1st century AD, it is the earliest known multiple arch dam.

== See also ==
- List of Roman dams and reservoirs
- Roman architecture
- Roman engineering
