= Esparragalejo =

- Municipality
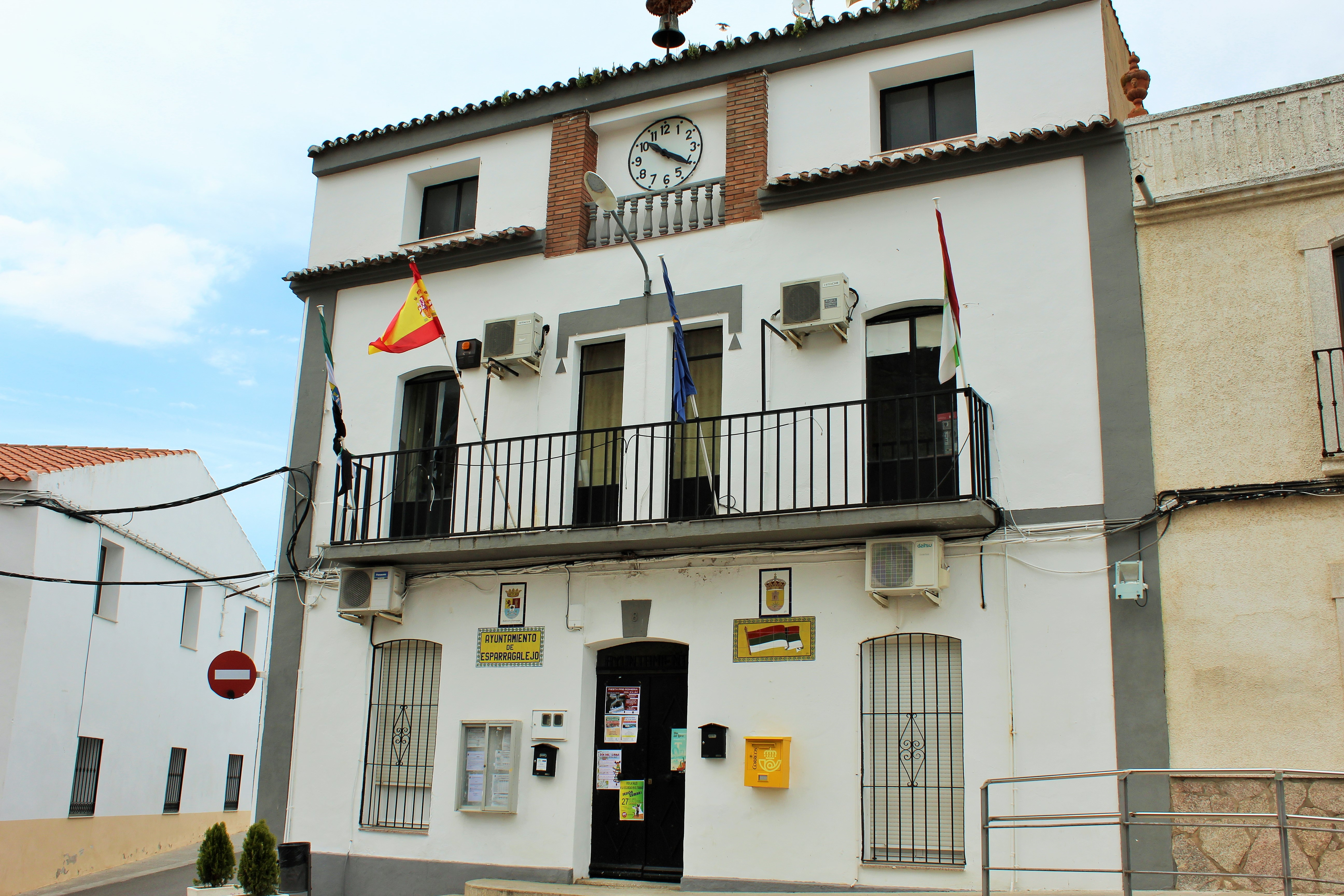
- Town hall

- Flag Coat of arms

- Location of Esparragalejo within Extremadura
- Coordinates: 38°56′37″N 6°26′12″W
- Country: Spain
- Autonomous Community: Extremadura
- Province: Badajoz
- Comarca: Tierra de Mérida - Vegas Bajas

Government
  - Mayor: José Francisco Ramírez Vadillo (PP-EU)

Area
  - Total: 17 km^{2} (6.6 sq mi)
- Elevation (AMSL): 231 m (758 ft)

Population (2025-01-01)
  - Total: 1,506
  - Density: 89/km^{2} (230/sq mi)
- Time zone: UTC+1 (CET)
  - Summer (DST): UTC+2 (CEST (GMT +2))
- Postal code: 06860
- Area code: +34 (Spain) + 924 (Badajoz)
- Website: www.esparragalejo.es

Esparragalejo (Spanish pronunciation: [es.pa.ra.ɣaˈle.xo]) is a municipality of Spain in the province of Badajoz, autonomous region of Extremadura.

Located about 13 km from Mérida, it is known for its unique Roman multiple arch buttress dam, the Esparragalejo Dam, its two natural lagoons, and its religious festivals. During the festivities to honor the town's patron saint, the Virgin of Good Health (Virgen de la Salud), its inhabitants come to the cathedral to witness the one-hour Mass and then occupy the streets completely. The townspeople take to the streets to put on a procession, to play music, and to put on shows for the town's children.

== Etymology ==
The name Esparragalejo refers to the communal pastureland known as the Esparragal. A diminutive suffix was added to the town name because the town remained small for many centuries.

== See also ==
- List of municipalities in Badajoz
