= Arroyo de San Serván =

- Municipality
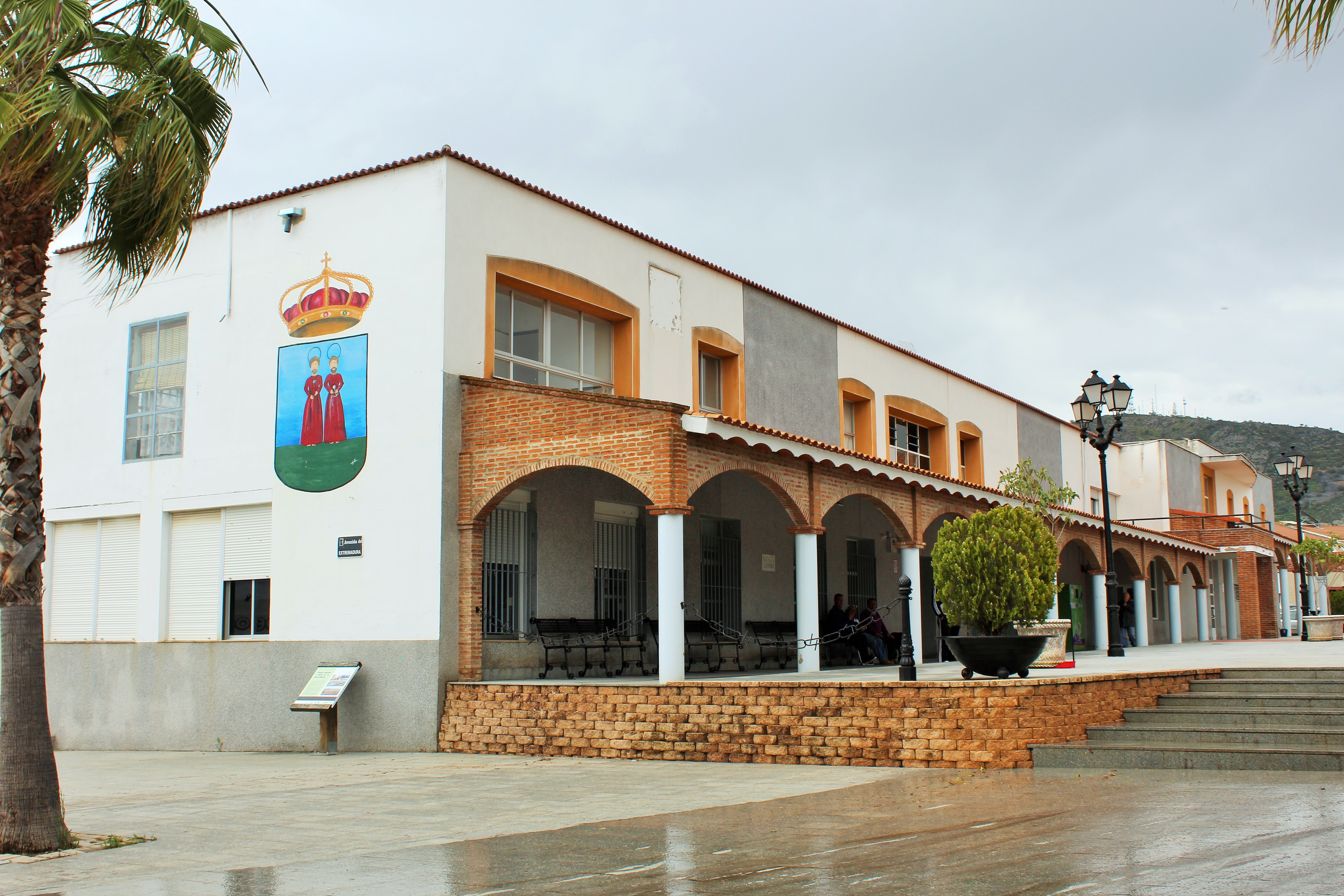

- Flag Coat of arms

- Location of Arroyo de San Serván within Extremadura
- Coordinates: 38°51′11″N 6°27′19″W
- Country: Spain
- Autonomous Community: Extremadura
- Province: Badajoz
- Comarca: Tierra de Mérida - Vegas Bajas

Government
  - Mayor: Juan Moreno Barroso (PSOE)

Area
  - Total: 50.1 km^{2} (19.3 sq mi)
- Elevation (AMSL): 224 m (735 ft)

Population (2025-01-01)
  - Total: 4,001
  - Density: 79.9/km^{2} (207/sq mi)
- Time zone: UTC+1 (CET)
  - Summer (DST): UTC+2 (CEST (GMT +2))
- Postal code: 06850
- Area code: +34 (Spain) + 924 (Badajoz)
- Website: Town Hall

Arroyo de San Serván is a municipality located in the province of Badajoz, Extremadura, Spain. According to the 2012 census (INE), the municipality has a population of 4267 inhabitants. The town's first census was held in 1842, as part of Badajoz.

== See also ==
- List of municipalities in Badajoz
