= Yashkul =

Rural locality in Kalmykia, Russia

Yashkul Яшкуль
- Rural locality
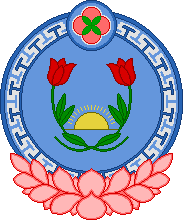
- Coat of arms

- Location within Russia
- Coordinates: 46°17′45″N 45°34′59″E
- Country: Russia
- Federal district: Southern Federal District
- Federal subject: Kalmykia
- District: Yashkulsky District

Population (2010)
  - Total: 7,861

Yashkul (Russian: Я́шкуль, Kalmyk: Яшкуль, Yaşkuľ) is a rural locality (a settlement) and the administrative center of Yashkulsky District of the Republic of Kalmykia, Russia. Population: 7,861 (2010 census); 7,399 (2002 census); 6,662 (1989 Soviet census).

== Climate ==
Yashkul has a cold semi-arid climate (Köppen climate classification BSk), with cold winters and some of the hottest summers in Russia.

Climate data for Yashkul (1991-2020)
Month	Jan	Feb	Mar	Apr	May	Jun	Jul	Aug	Sep	Oct	Nov	Dec	Year
Record high °C (°F)	17.0 (62.6)	19.5 (67.1)	28.6 (83.5)	32.6 (90.7)	38.5 (101.3)	41.9 (107.4)	44.4 (111.9)	43.5 (110.3)	40.4 (104.7)	31.8 (89.2)	21.9 (71.4)	17.2 (63.0)	44.4 (111.9)
Mean daily maximum °C (°F)	0.2 (32.4)	1.6 (34.9)	8.9 (48.0)	17.6 (63.7)	25.2 (77.4)	30.9 (87.6)	33.7 (92.7)	32.8 (91.0)	25.5 (77.9)	17.0 (62.6)	7.3 (45.1)	1.8 (35.2)	16.9 (62.4)
Daily mean °C (°F)	−3 (27)	−2.5 (27.5)	3.4 (38.1)	11.1 (52.0)	18.3 (64.9)	23.9 (75.0)	26.6 (79.9)	25.4 (77.7)	18.5 (65.3)	11.0 (51.8)	3.1 (37.6)	−1.4 (29.5)	11.2 (52.2)
Mean daily minimum °C (°F)	−5.6 (21.9)	−5.5 (22.1)	−1.0 (30.2)	5.3 (41.5)	12.0 (53.6)	17.2 (63.0)	19.7 (67.5)	18.1 (64.6)	12.2 (54.0)	6.3 (43.3)	0.0 (32.0)	−3.9 (25.0)	6.2 (43.2)
Record low °C (°F)	−32.8 (−27.0)	−33.5 (−28.3)	−30.4 (−22.7)	−9.9 (14.2)	−6.1 (21.0)	3.1 (37.6)	6.3 (43.3)	4.0 (39.2)	−6.2 (20.8)	−18.2 (−0.8)	−26.6 (−15.9)	−30.3 (−22.5)	−33.5 (−28.3)
Average precipitation mm (inches)	15 (0.6)	13 (0.5)	21 (0.8)	25 (1.0)	39 (1.5)	36 (1.4)	28 (1.1)	20 (0.8)	25 (1.0)	26 (1.0)	18 (0.7)	18 (0.7)	284 (11.1)
Average rainy days	6	5	6	7	9	8	6	6	6	7	10	8	84
Average snowy days	9	7	5	0.2	0	0	0	0	0	0.3	3	8	32.5
Average relative humidity (%)	83	80	74	66	61	56	51	52	61	72	81	84	68
Source: Roshydromet
