= Yashkulsky District =

Yashkulsky District Яшкульский район (Russian)
- District

Other transcription(s)
  - Kalmyk: Яшкулин район
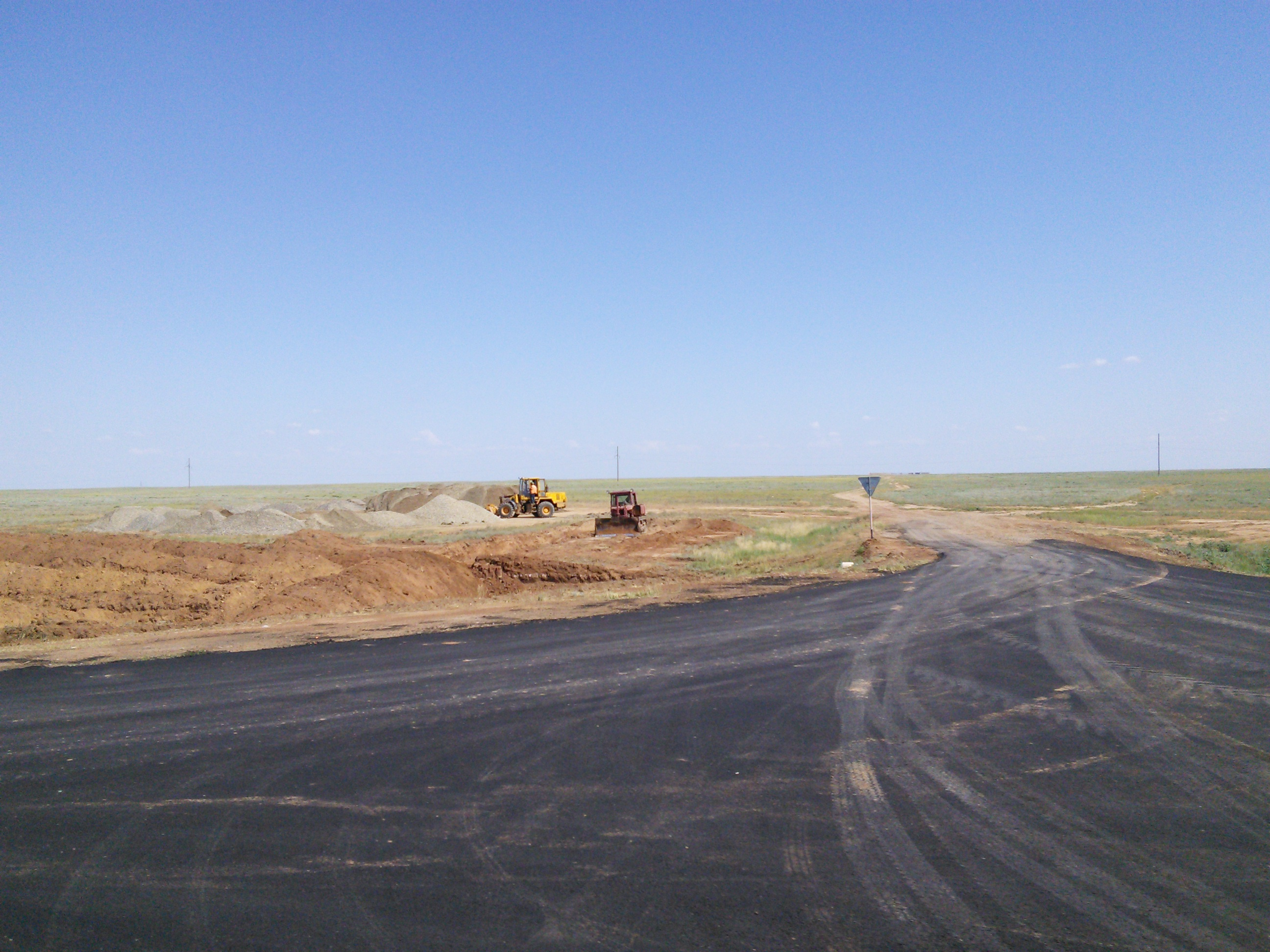
- Road Construction in Yashkulsky District
- Location of Yashkulsky District in the Republic of Kalmykia
- Coordinates: 46°10′N 45°21′E
- Country: Russia
- Federal subject: Republic of Kalmykia
- Established: 1920
- Administrative center: Yashkul

Area
  - Total: 11,769.31 km^{2} (4,544.16 sq mi)

Population (2010 Census)
  - Total: 15,270
  - Density: 1.297/km^{2} (3.360/sq mi)
  - Urban: 0%
  - Rural: 100%

Administrative structure
  - Administrative divisions: 12 Rural administrations
  - Inhabited localities: 27 rural localities

Municipal structure
  - Municipally incorporated as: Yashkulsky Municipal District
  - Municipal divisions: 0 urban settlements, 12 rural settlements
- Time zone: UTC+3 (MSK)
- OKTMO ID: 85654000
- Website: http://yashkulrmo.rk08.ru

Population of Yashkulsky District
- 2010 Census: 15,270
- 2002 Census: 15,734
- 1989 Census: 21,086
- 1979 Census: 20,296

Yashkulsky District (Russian: Я́шкульский райо́н; Kalmyk: Яшкулин район, Yaşkulin rayon) is an administrative and municipal district (raion), one of the thirteen in the Republic of Kalmykia, Russia. It is located in the center and east of the republic. The area of the district is 11,769.31 square kilometers (4,544.16 sq mi). Its administrative center is the rural locality (a settlement) of Yashkul. As of the 2010 Census, the total population of the district was 15,270, with the population of Yashkul accounting for 51.5% of that number.

== History ==
The district was established in 1920.

== Administrative and municipal status ==
Within the framework of administrative divisions, Yashkulsky District is one of the thirteen in the Republic of Kalmykia. The district is divided into twelve rural administrations which comprise twenty-seven rural localities. As a municipal division, the district is incorporated as Yashkulsky Municipal District. Its twelve rural administrations are incorporated as twelve rural settlements within the municipal district. The settlement of Yashkul serves as the administrative center of both the administrative and municipal district.
