= Villar del Rey =

Coordinates: 39°8′N 6°51′W

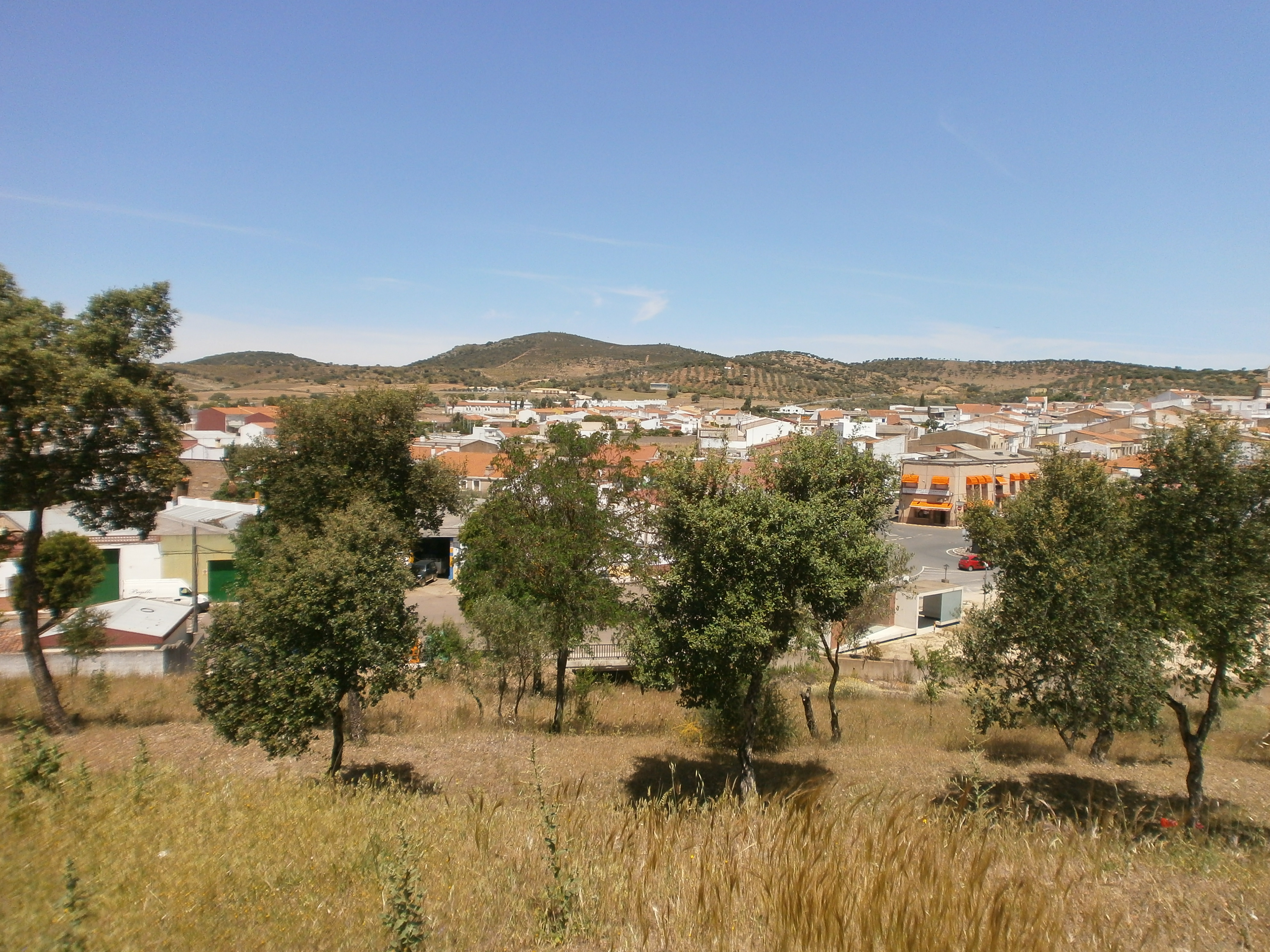

- Flag Coat of arms
- Interactive map of Villar del Rey
- Country: Spain
- Autonomous community: Extremadura
- Province: Badajoz
- Comarca: Tierra de Badajoz

Government
  - Alcalde: Eduardo Durán Durán

Area
  - Total: 98.9 km^{2} (38.2 sq mi)
- Elevation: 241 m (791 ft)

Population (2025-01-01)
  - Total: 2,064
- Time zone: UTC+1 (CET)
  - Summer (DST): UTC+2 (CEST)
- Website: Ayuntamiento de Villar del Rey

Villar del Rey is a Spanish municipality in the province of Badajoz, Extremadura. It has a population of 2,540 (2007) and an area of 98.9 km^{2}.

== See also ==
- List of municipalities in Badajoz
