= Calamonte =

- municipality
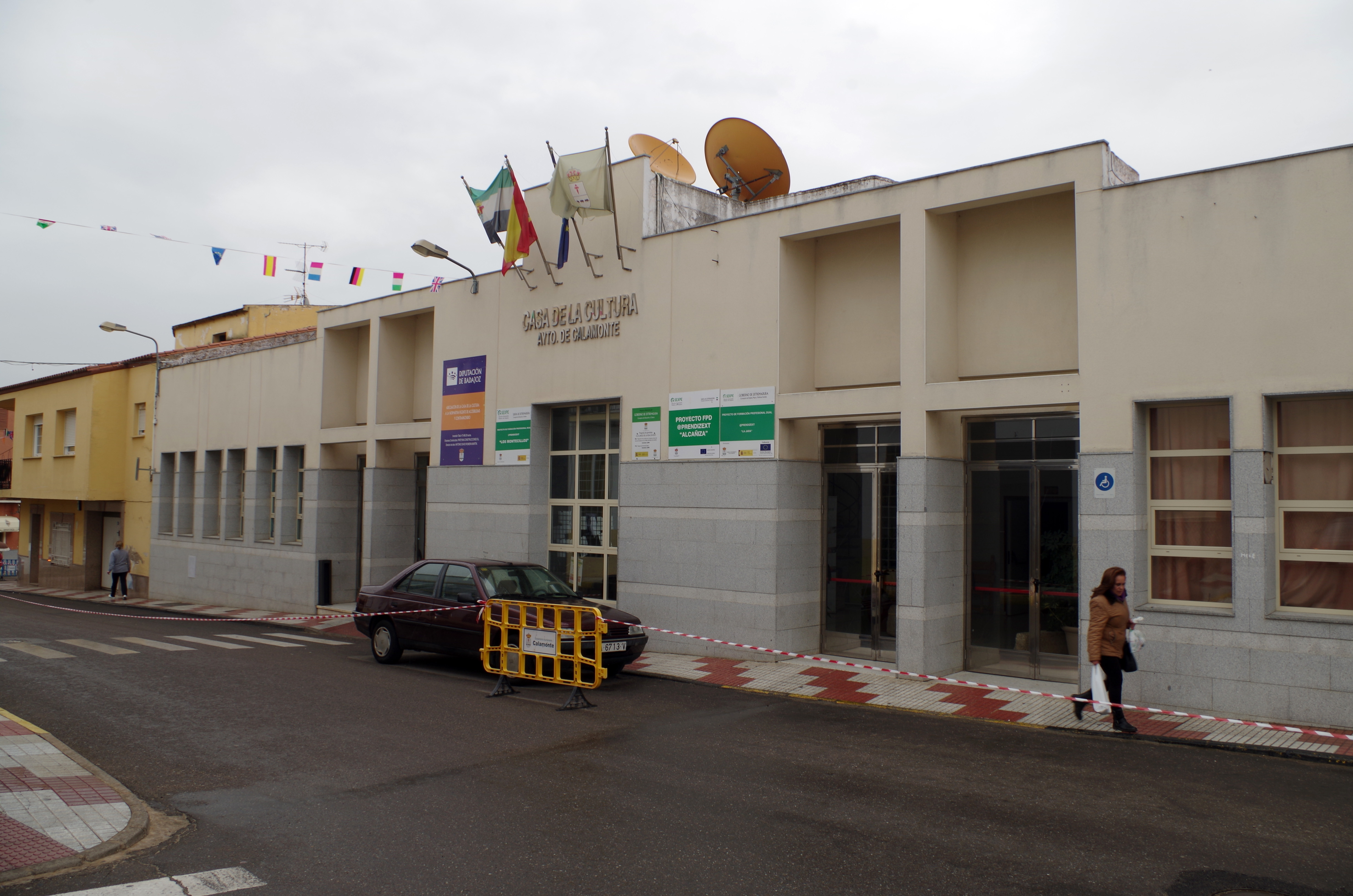
- Town hall

- Coat of arms

- Location of Calamonte within Extremadura
- Coordinates: 38°53′24″N 6°23′6″W
- Country: Spain
- Autonomous community: Extremadura
- Province: Badajoz
- Municipality: Calamonte

Area
  - Total: 8 km^{2} (3.1 sq mi)
- Elevation: 221 m (725 ft)

Population (2025-01-01)
  - Total: 6,104
  - Density: 760/km^{2} (2,000/sq mi)
- Time zone: UTC+1 (CET)
  - Summer (DST): UTC+2 (CEST)

Calamonte is a municipality located in the province of Badajoz, Extremadura, Spain. According to the 2006 census (INE), the municipality has a population of 6084 inhabitants.

== See also ==
- List of municipalities in Badajoz
