= Talavera la Real =

Coordinates: 38°53′N 6°46′W

Talavera la Real, Spain
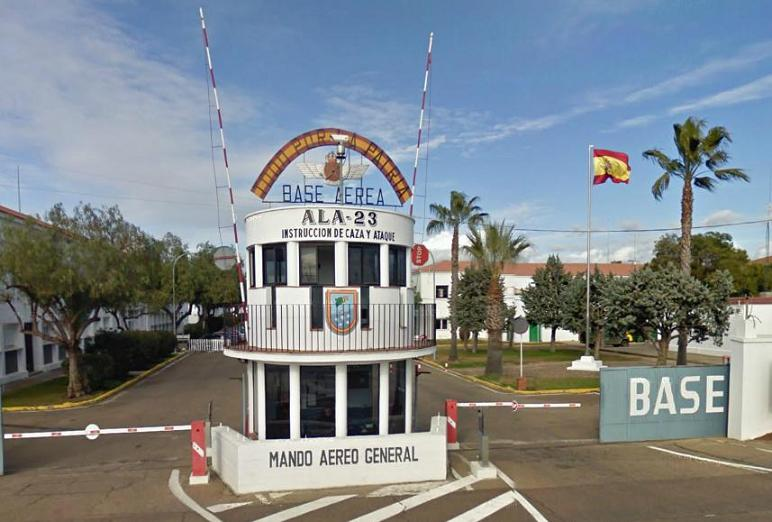
- Talavera la Real Air Base

- Coat of arms
- Interactive map of Talavera la Real, Spain
- Country: Spain
- Autonomous community: Extremadura
- Province: Badajoz
- Municipality: Talavera la Real

Area
  - Total: 61 km^{2} (24 sq mi)
- Elevation: 188 m (617 ft)

Population (2025-01-01)
  - Total: 5,288
  - Density: 87/km^{2} (220/sq mi)
- Time zone: UTC+1 (CET)
  - Summer (DST): UTC+2 (CEST)

Talavera la Real is a municipality located in the province of Badajoz, Extremadura, Spain. According to the 2006 census (INE), the municipality has a population of 5255 inhabitants.

== Climate ==
Climate data for Talavera la Real
Month	Jan	Feb	Mar	Apr	May	Jun	Jul	Aug	Sep	Oct	Nov	Dec	Year
Mean daily maximum °C (°F)	13 (55)	14 (58)	17 (63)	21 (69)	24 (76)	30 (86)	33 (92)	34 (93)	29 (84)	23 (74)	17 (62)	13 (56)	22 (72)
Mean daily minimum °C (°F)	4 (39)	4 (40)	7 (45)	9 (48)	12 (53)	16 (60)	17 (63)	18 (64)	16 (61)	12 (54)	7 (45)	4 (40)	11 (51)
Average precipitation cm (inches)	5.1 (2)	5.1 (2)	6.1 (2.4)	4.1 (1.6)	2.8 (1.1)	2.5 (1)	0.25 (0.1)	0.51 (0.2)	2.5 (1)	4.6 (1.8)	5.8 (2.3)	4.8 (1.9)	44 (17.4)
Source: Weatherbase

== See also ==
- List of municipalities in Badajoz
