= Valdelacalzada =

Coordinates: 38°53′0″N 6°42′0″W

- municipality
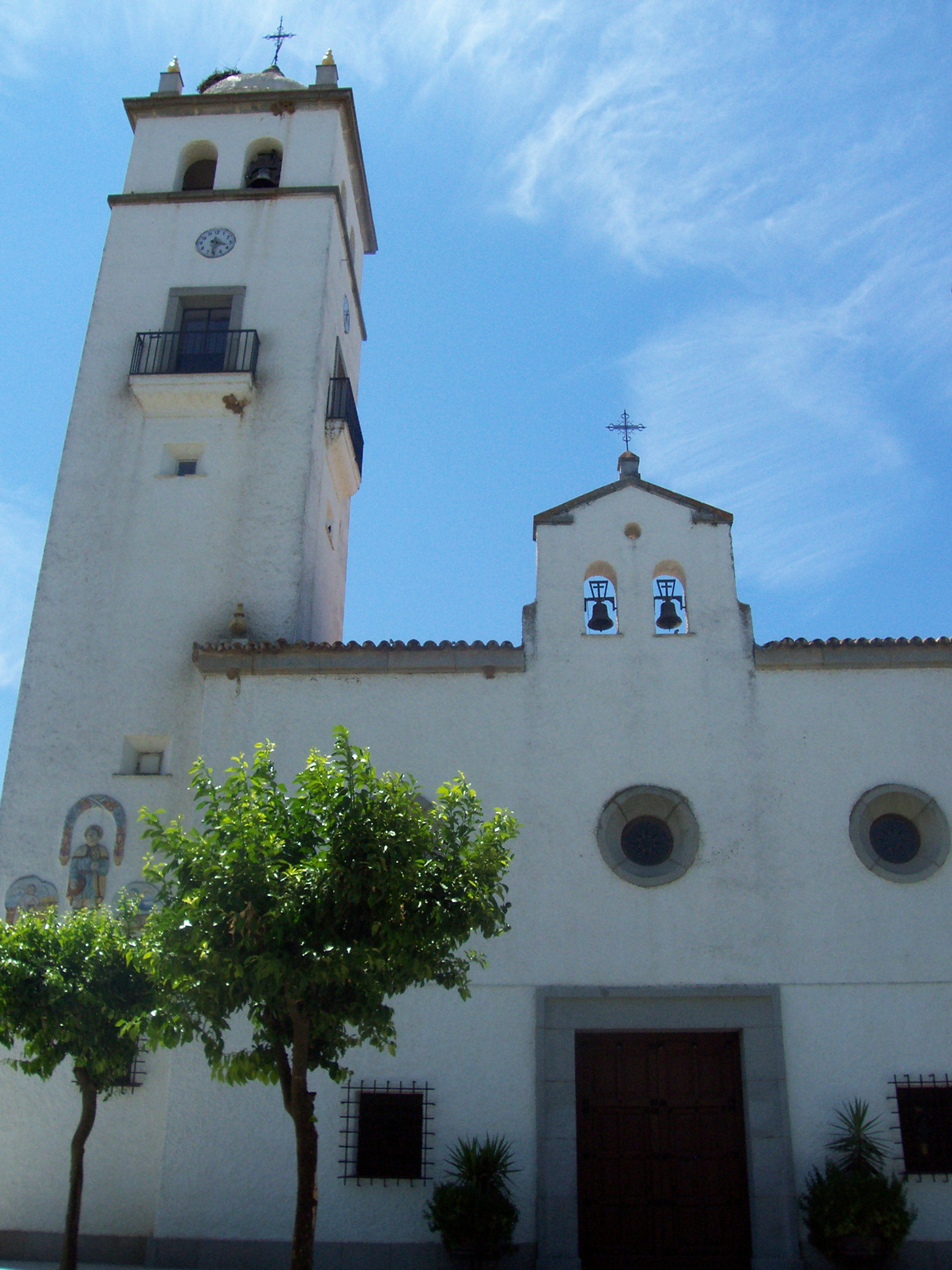

- Coat of arms
- Interactive map of Valdelacalzada
- Country: Spain
- Autonomous community: Extremadura
- Province: Badajoz

Area
  - Total: 32 km^{2} (12 sq mi)
- Elevation: 186 m (610 ft)

Population (2025-01-01)
  - Total: 2,743
  - Density: 86/km^{2} (220/sq mi)
- Time zone: UTC+1 (CET)
  - Summer (DST): UTC+2 (CEST)

Valdelacalzada is a municipality located in the province of Badajoz, Extremadura, Spain. According to the 2005 census (INE), the municipality has a population of 2,700 inhabitants.

== See also ==
- List of municipalities in Badajoz
