= Siege of Olivença =

1811 siege during the Peninsular War

- Part of Peninsular War
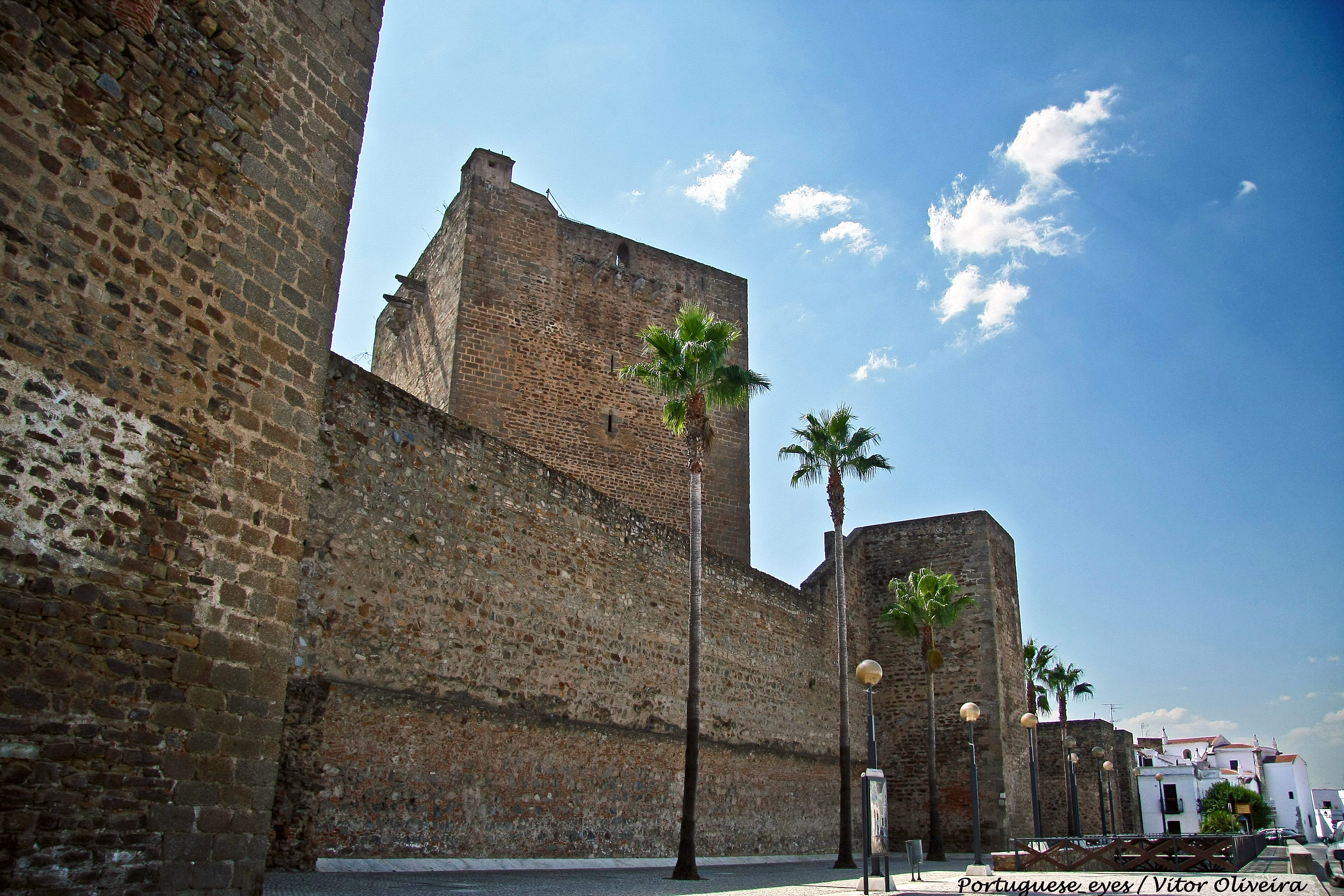
- Castelo de Olivença was damaged during the Peninsular War.
Date	19–22 January 1811
Location	Olivença, Portugal, (current Spain) 38°40′57.52″N 7°6′9.60″W
Result	French victory

Belligerents
(France) First French Empire	Kingdom of Spain

Commanders and leaders
Marshal Soult	Gabriel de Mendizábal; Don Manual Herck

Strength
6,000	4,361

Casualties and losses
15 killed, 40 wounded	200 killed 4,161 taken captive

The siege of Olivença or Olivenza occurred on 19-22 January 1811 when French General Jean-de-Dieu Soult successfully undertook the capture of the run-down Spanish fortress of Olivenza in western Spain during the Peninsular War.

On his way to storming the stronger fortress at Badajoz, Soult was obliged to modify his original plans. Sending his light cavalry under Brigadier General André Briche to take Mérida and leaving four squadrons of dragoons at Albuera to watch the garrison at Badajoz, he marched with the remainder of his army to invest Olivenza.

Wellington had previously advised General Pedro de La Romana, commander of the Spanish Army of Extremadura, to either destroy the fortification at Olivenza or to repair its defences and fully garrison the town; La Romana in turn had instructed Mendizabal to slight the fortress, but Mendizabal ignored this order and reinforced the garrison with four infantry battalions. Soult, arrived on 11 January and was confronted with a strongly garrisoned, but untenable, fortress. The French heavy artillery arrived on 19 January, and by 22 January, a poorly repaired breach in the fortress's walls had been reopened. The garrison surrendered on 23 January, with over 4,000 Spanish troops from the Army of Extremadura taken captive.

Soult was now in a difficult position. Although he had a large (4,000-strong) contingent of cavalry, deploying two battalions to escort the prisoners taken at Olivenza back to French-held Seville left him only 5,500 infantry with which to continue his campaign. Although his siege-train had begun to arrive, the continued absence of Gazan's infantry division left him with a weakened army. Despite these problems, Soult decided to besiege Badajoz in hopes that Wellington would send reinforcements to the Spanish fortress and thereby reduce the Allied forces facing Masséna at the Lines of Torres Vedras. On 26 January, Soult set off for Badajoz, sending General Latour-Maubourg with six cavalry battalions across the Guadiana to blockade the fortress's northern approach, and by 27 January, the first siege of Badajoz had commenced.

== See also ==
- Battle of the Gebora
