= First siege of Badajoz (1811) =

1811 siege during the Peninsular War

- Part of Peninsular War
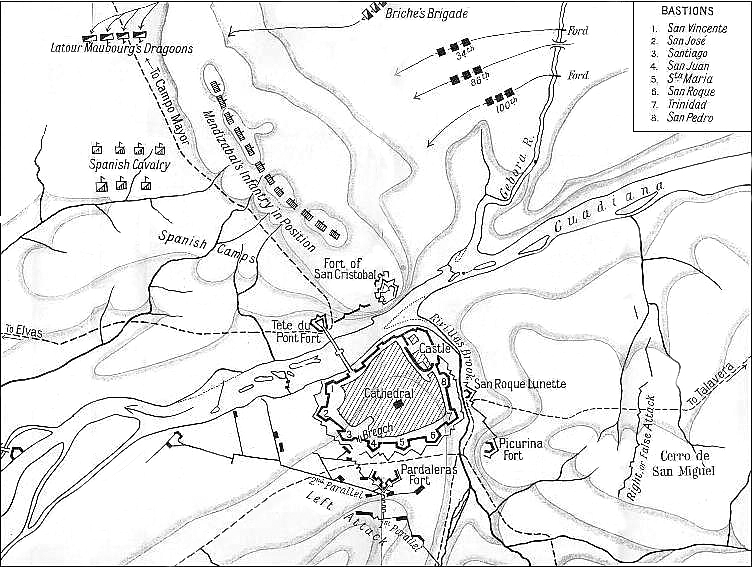
- Map of the Battle of the Gebora and the first siege of Badajoz
Date	26 January 1811 – 11 March 1811
Location	Badajoz, Spain 38°52′49″N 6°58′31″W
Result	French victory

Belligerents
(France) First French Empire	Kingdom of Spain

Commanders and leaders
(France) Marshal Soult	(Spain) Rafael Menacho † (Spain) José Imaz

Strength
17,000	21,000 at the beginning 9,000 at the end

Casualties and losses
1,500 killed or wounded	7,000 killed or wounded 14,000 captured

Peninsular War
Castile 1811–13
current battle

The first siege of Badajoz was a siege carried out during the Peninsular War on the Spanish town of Badajoz, by the French general Soult.

It commenced on 27 January 1811, despite the fact that Gazan's infantry division of 6,000 men, which was escorting the siege train, would not arrive until 3 February. The previous day, Soult had sent General Latour-Maubourg's six cavalry battalions across the Guadiana to blockade the fortress's northern approach.

== Background ==
The stalemate in the west started with the first siege of Badajoz.

== Prelude to the siege ==
In order to draw some of the Allied forces away from Masséna and the Lines of Torres Vedras, Soult had led an expedition of 20,000 men into Extremadura with the aim of capturing the Spanish fortress at Badajoz.

Dividing his army into two contingents, he advanced into Extremadura via the two main passes leading from Andalusia into the Guadiana valley, with the intention of rejoining at Almendralejo. Although the columns commanded by Latour-Maubourg had been confronted by 2,500 Spanish and Portuguese cavalry near Usagre on 3 January 1811, it was only a screen covering the retreat beyond the Guadiana of a Spanish infantry division commanded by General Mendizábal. Latour-Maubourg was therefore able to take up his position near Almendralejo and await the arrival of Soult's second French column.

=== Siege of Olivenza ===
Not yet being able to besiege so strong a fortress as Badajoz because of his reduced force, Soult changed his original plans and sent his light cavalry under Brigadier General André Briche to take Mérida and leaving four squadrons of dragoons at Albuera to watch the garrison at Badajoz, he marched with the remainder of his army to invest Olivenza.

== Siege ==
In September 1810, Rafael Menacho was promoted to field marshal and appointed military and civil governor of Badajoz, as well as commanding officer of its garrison.

At the beginning of 1811, the garrison at Badajoz consisted of 4,100 men. However, before withdrawing towards Portugal, Mendizábal had added two battalions more (1st and 2nd of the Second Regiment of Seville) raising the Spanish troops there to 5,000.

Following Mendizábal's rout at Gebora, the remnants of his army (1,108 men of La Carrera's division, 554 of Virues's division, and 995 of battalions of Garcia's division) took refuge at Badajoz, bringing the number of troops at the garrison up to over 8,000 men.

On 3 March, Menacho sent out a sortie which spiked the twelve guns of the two nearest besieging batteries. However, while he was watching the progress of the action from the ramparts of the castle, he was killed by a chance shot. The following week, the new commander, Brigadier José Imaz, called a council of war which decided to surrender to Mortier.

=== Oman's comment ===
Oman, in his A History of the Peninsular War, Vol. IV (1911), was especially critical of Imaz's surrender, summing it up as follows:

Badajoz was found by the victors to contain rations for 8,000 men sufficient to last for over a month, more than 150 serviceable cannon, 80,000 lb. of powder, 300,000 infantry cartridges, and two bridge equipages. There is not the slightest doubt that if Menacho had lived the place would have held out till it was relieved by Beresford. For the latter, who was finally ordered to move to its relief on March 12th, would have reached its neighbourhood on the 18th. (Oman 1911, p. 61.)

== Aftermath ==
The stalemate in the west proceeded with the second siege of Badajoz.

== See also ==
- Battle of the Gebora

== Bibliography ==
- Bodart, Gaston (1908). Militär-historisches Kriegs-Lexikon (1618-1905). Wien und Leipzig, C. W. Stern.
- Gates, David (2002), The Spanish Ulcer: A History of the Peninsular War, Pimlico, ISBN 978-0-7126-9730-9
- Glover, Michael (2001), The Peninsular War 1807–1814: A Concise Military History, Penguin Classic Military History, ISBN 978-0-14-139041-3
- Oman, Sir Charles (2004), A History of the Peninsular War: Volume IV, December 1810 to December 1811, Greenhill Books, ISBN 978-1-85367-618-5
