= Henry Walton Ellis =

British Army officer (1782–1815)

Sir Henry Ellis KCB
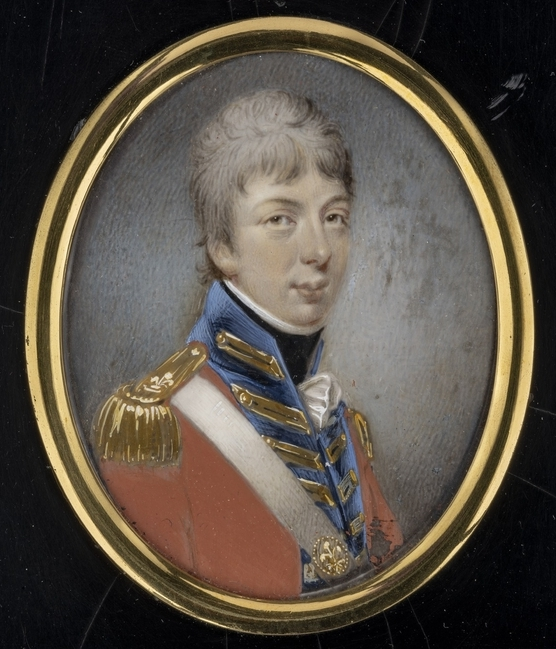
- Miniature of Ellis as a colonel
- Born: 29 November 1782; Cheltenham, England
- Died: 20 June 1815 (aged 32); Waterloo, Belgium
- Military career
- Allegiance: United Kingdom
- Branch: British Army
- Service years: 1788–1815
- Rank: Colonel
- Commands: 23rd Regiment of Foot
- Conflicts: French Revolutionary Wars; Expedition to Ostend; Anglo-Russian Invasion of Holland; Battle of Callantsoog (WIA); Battle of Krabbendam; Battle of Alkmaar; Battle of Castricum; Ferrol Expedition; Egypt Campaign; Battle of Abukir (WIA); Battle of Mandora; Battle of Alexandria; Napoleonic Wars; Hanover Expedition; Copenhagen Expedition; Caribbean Campaign; Invasion of Martinique; Peninsular War; Battle of Redinha; Siege of Olivença; Second Siege of Badajoz; Battle of Albuera (WIA); Siege of Ciudad Rodrigo; Third Siege of Badajoz (WIA); Battle of Salamanca (WIA); Battle of Vitoria; Battle of the Pyrenees; Battle of Roncesvalles; Battle of Sorauren (WIA); Battle of the Bidassoa; Battle of Nivelle; Battle of the Nive; Battle of Orthez; Battle of Toulouse; Hundred Days; Battle of Waterloo (DOW)
- Awards: Army Gold Cross

Colonel Sir Henry Walton Ellis KCB (29 November 1782 – 20 June 1815) was a British soldier in the Napoleonic Wars.

== Life ==
Henry Walton Ellis was born on 29 November 1782, the son of Major General John Joyner Ellis, and grandson of J. Joyner of Berkeley, Gloucestershire. He was born in Cambray, Cheltenham and baptised 6 October 1783, almost a year later, in Worcester, England. His father, Joyner Ellis, had taken the name Ellis in consequence of his adoption by 'Governor' Henry Ellis, lieutenant governor of Georgia, 1758, who lived for some time at Lansdowne Place, Bath, and died at Naples in 1806. Joyner Ellis served successively in the 18th, old 89th, and 41st Foot, became lieutenant-colonel of the 23rd Royal Welsh Fusiliers in 1793, major-general in 1798 and died 1804. He was member of parliament for Worcester for some years. By his wife, whose maiden name was Walton, he had several children, the eldest of whom, Henry Walton Ellis, was born at Worcester in 1783, and immediately appointed an ensign in the 89th foot, of which Joyner Ellis was major.

The regiment, which had been chiefly recruited around Worcester, was disbanded at the peace a few months later, and the baby was put on half-pay; but brought on full pay again as an ensign, at the age of five, in the 41st Foot, of which Joyner Ellis had been appointed major on its reorganisation in 1787.

== Military career ==
Young Ellis became a lieutenant in the 41st Foot in 1792, and captain in the 23rd Fusiliers on 20 January 1796. Joining the Fusiliers, a boy-captain of barely fourteen, he served with it in the descent on Ostend in 1798, in the 1799 Anglo-Russian invasion of Holland (wounded), in the Channel, at Ferrol and in the Mediterranean in 1800, in Egypt in 1801 (wounded, gold medal and rank of major), in Hanover in 1805, and at Copenhagen in 1807. A youthful veteran of twenty-five, he succeeded to the command of the first battalion of his regiment, without purchase, in Nova Scotia in 1808, and commanded it in the expedition against Martinique in 1809, where at the siege of Fort Bourbon he offered to take the flints out of his men's firelocks and carry the works with his fusiliers at the point of the bayonet, an enterprise which the commander-in-chief, Sir George Beckwith, refused to sanction.

He proceeded with his battalion to Portugal in 1810, and commanded it through the succeeding campaigns in the Peninsula and south of France, during which he repeatedly distinguished himself, particularly at the Battle of Albuera, on the occasion of the historic charge of the fusilier brigade, at the siege of Badajos in 1812 (wounded), and in the desperate fighting at the pass of Roncesvalles in the Pyrenees on 28 July 1813.

For his Peninsular services he was promoted to colonel and appointed Knight Commander of the Order of the Bath. Under his command the Royal Welsh Fusiliers joined the Duke of Wellington's army on the field of Waterloo the night before the battle, having made a forced march from Grammont.

They were in reserve during the greater part of 18 June, but were brought up into the front line on the left later in the day, and received several French charges in square. Here Ellis received a musket-ball through the right breast. Feeling faint he rode out of the square towards the rear, but in getting over a small ditch fell from his horse and sustained further injuries. He was carried to a neighbouring hovel and his wounds dressed. In the evening of 19 June, after the army had moved on, the hut caught fire. Ellis was rescued with great difficulty by Assistant-Surgeon Munro of his regiment, but not before he had received severe burns, to which he succumbed on the morning of 20 June 1815. He was buried at Waterloo.

== Legacy and memorials ==
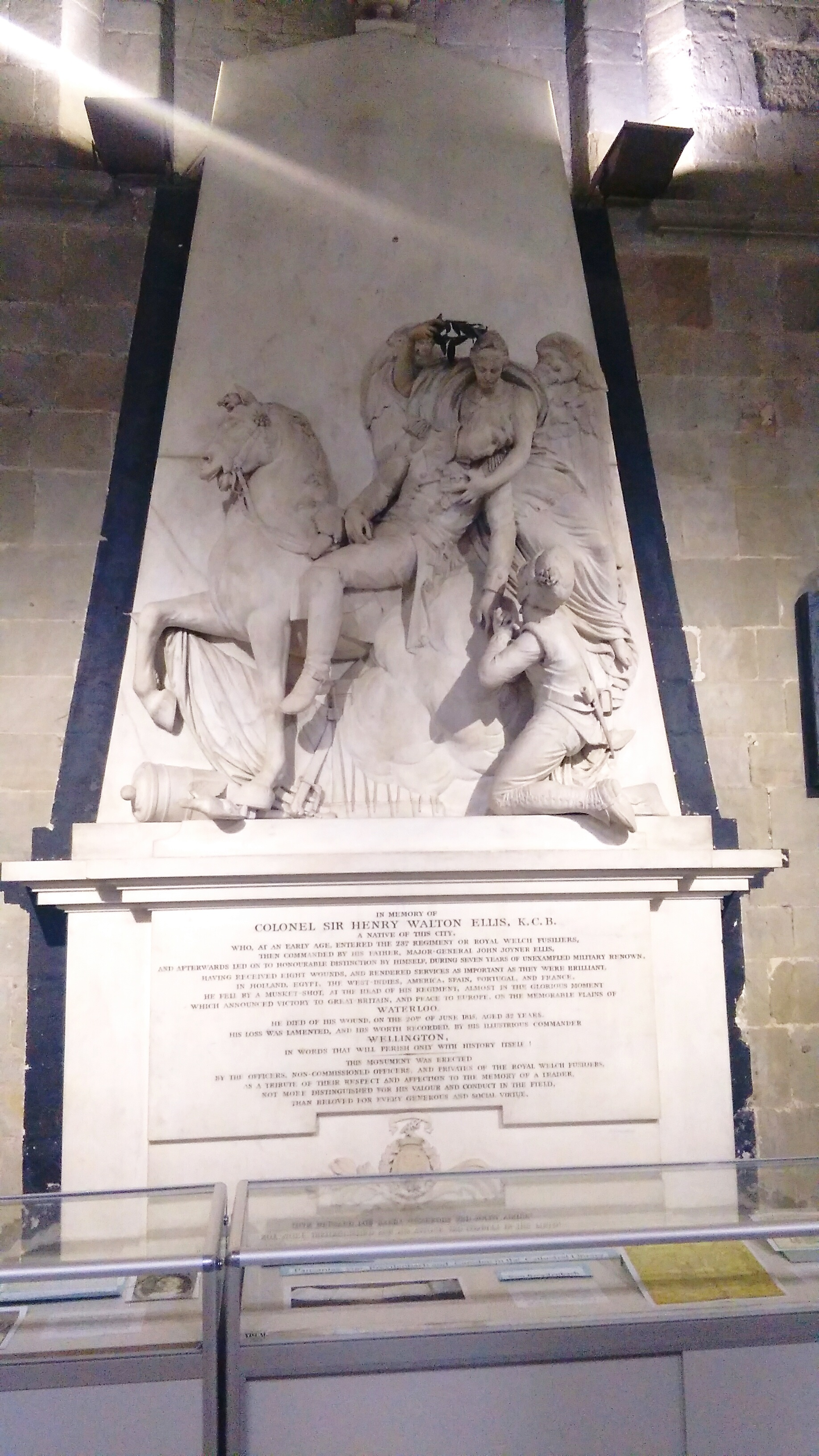
Memorial to Henry Walton Ellis at Worcester Cathedral

The officers and men of the Royal Welsh Fusiliers placed a monument, by the London sculptor, John Bacon, to his memory in Worcester Cathedral at a cost of £1,200.

== Personal life ==
Ellis never married. He left two sons, to whom the Duke of Wellington gave commissions. Of these the younger, Henry, died young on passage home from India. The elder, Francis Joyner Ellis, died a major in the 62nd foot at Moulmein in 1840. On his death the name of Ellis was assumed by a surviving brother of Major-general John Joyner Ellis, William Joyner, many years coroner of Gloucestershire.

A grant of arms was made to his family on 14 February 1817.

== Notes ==
=== References ===
Attribution

- This article incorporates text from a publication now in the public domain: Chichester, Henry Manners (1889). "Ellis, Henry Walton". In Stephen, Leslie (ed.). Dictionary of National Biography. Vol. 17. London: Smith, Elder & Co. p. 282. Endnotes:
  - Ellis's Notices of the Ellis's of England and France, 1855-66 (printed privately), page 154
  - Annual Army Lists, in most of which the name is incorrectly given as Henry 'Watson' Ellis
  - William Francis Patrick Napier (1828–1840). History of the War in the Peninsula.
  - London Gazettes, various.
  - Richard Cannon (1850). Historical Record of The Twenty-Third Regiment or The Royal Welsh Fusiliers; containing an Account of the Formation of the Regiment in 1689, and of its subsequent Services to 1850. London: Parker, Furnivall, & Parker. pp. 132–134.
