= Rafael Menacho =

Spanish military officer (1766–1811)

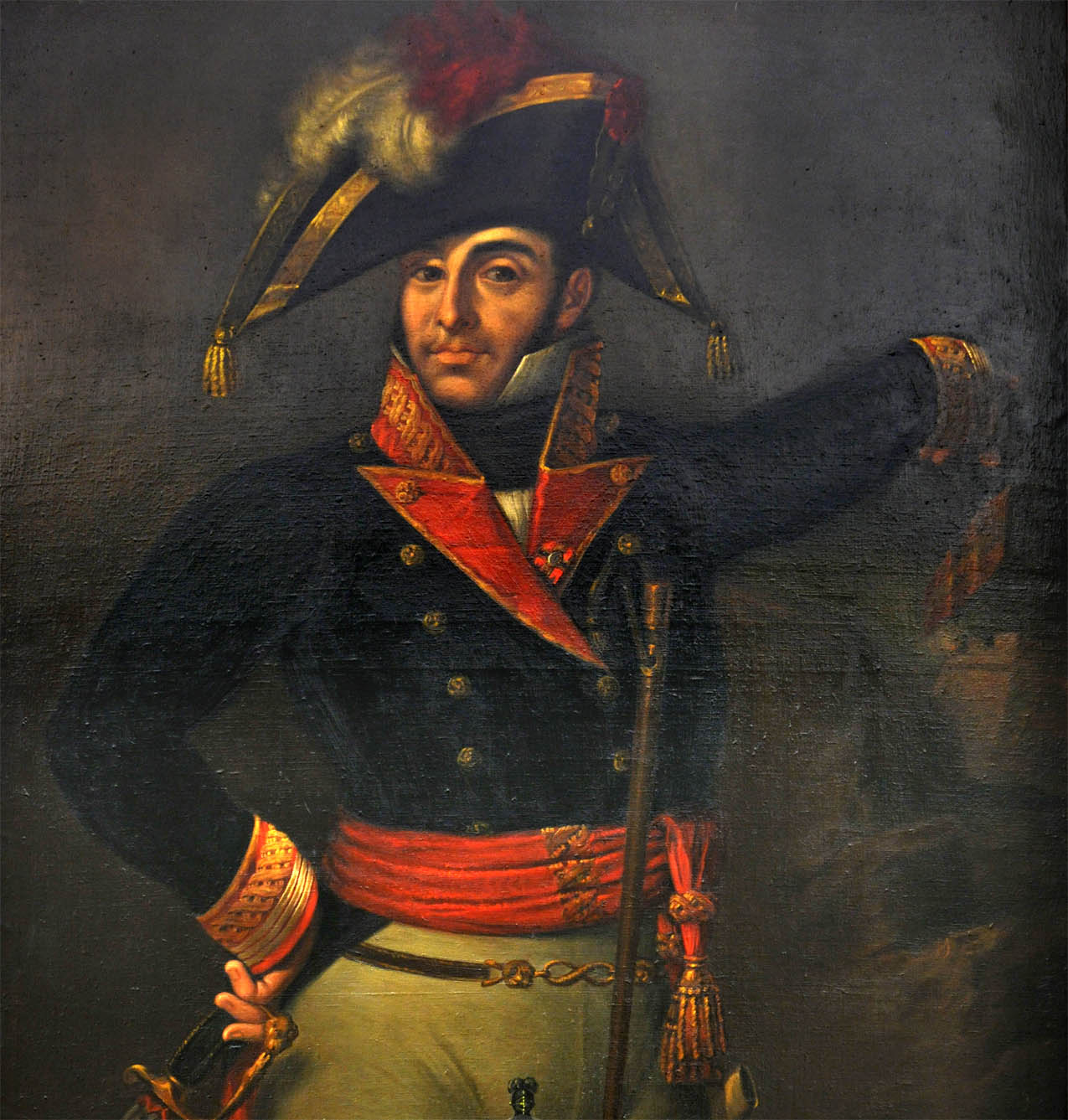
- Portrait of Menacho, Museum of the Cortes de Cádiz
- Born: 22 May 1776; Cádiz, Andalusia
- Died: 11 March 1811 (aged 34) Badajoz, Extremadura
- Allegiance: Spain
- Conflicts: War of the Pyrenees; Argelès; Peninsular War; Battle of Bailén; First siege of Badajoz (1811) †

Rafael Menacho y Tutlló (1766–1811) was a Spanish military commander during the Peninsular War. He was killed in action during the first siege of Badajoz in 1811.

== Early career ==
Born in Cádiz, Menacho attended the military school at El Puerto de Santa María, and in 1784 enlisted in the Regimiento de Infantería de la Victoria n.º 38 as a cadet. He stayed with that regiment for the following ten years. Garrisoned at Valencia, at the outbreak of the war against France in 1793, he requested, on three occasions, to be sent on active service in the field, finally seeing action at the retreat of Argelès (October 1793), where he was seriously wounded.

In 1795, he transferred to the Voluntarios de Cazadores de la Corona, seeing action in several combats in Portugal.

== Peninsular War ==
At the outbreak of the war, Menacho left with his regiment, on 1 July 1808, to join the forces of General Pedro Agustín de Echevarri. On 10 June, his battalion joined General Castaños's vanguard, and the following week he was given the command of the vanguard of Lieutenant general Manuel de la Peña's division, with which he participated at the Battle of Bailén.

In September 1810, Menacho was promoted to field marshal and appointed military and civil governor of Badajoz, as well as commanding officer of its garrison.

=== Siege of Badajoz ===
At the beginning of 1811, the garrison at Badajoz consisted of 4,100 men. However, before withdrawing towards Portugal, Mendizábal had added two battalions more (1st and 2nd of the Second Regiment of Seville) raising the Spanish troops there to 5,000.

Following Mendizábal's rout at Gebora, the remnants of his army (1,108 men of La Carrera's division, 554 of Virues's division, and 995 of battalions of Garcia's division) took refuge at Badajoz, bringing the number of troops at the garrison up to over 8,000 men.

On 3 March, Menacho sent out a sortie which spiked the twelve guns of the two nearest besieging batteries. However, while he was watching the progress of the action from the ramparts of the castle, he was killed by a chance shot. The following week, the new commander, Brigadier José Imaz, called a council of war which decided to surrender to Mortier.

=== Oman's comment ===
Oman, in his A History of the Peninsular War, Vol. IV (1911), was especially critical of Imaz's surrender, summing it up as follows:

Badajoz was found by the victors to contain rations for 8,000 men sufficient to last for over a month, more than 150 serviceable cannon, 80,000 lb. of powder, 300,000 infantry cartridges, and two bridge equipages. There is not the slightest doubt that if Menacho had lived the place would have held out till it was relieved by Beresford. For the latter, who was finally ordered to move to its relief on March 12th, would have reached its neighbourhood on the 18th. (Oman 1911, p. 61.)
