= André Briche =

French general (1772–1825)

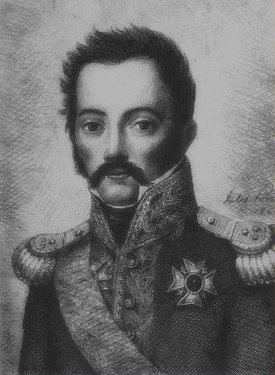
- General of Division André Briche
- Born: 12 August 1772; Neuilly-sous-Clermont, France
- Died: 21 May 1825 (aged 52) Marseille, France
- Allegiance: France
- Branch: Cavalry
- Service years: 1790–1825
- Rank: General of Division
- Conflicts: French Revolutionary Wars; Battle of Trebbia; Battle of Marengo; Napoleonic Wars; Battle of Saalfeld; Battle of Jena; Siege of Zaragoza; Battle of Ocaña; Battle of the Gebora; Battle of Albuera; Battle of Lützen; Battle of Dresden; Battle of Brienne; Battle of La Rothière; Battle of Bar-sur-Aube
- Awards: Légion d'Honneur, CC 1811, GC 1821; Order of Saint-Louis, 1814
- Other work: Baron of the Empire, 1809

André-Louis-Elisabeth-Marie Briche (12 August 1772 – 21 May 1825) was a French General of the First French Empire who saw action during the Peninsular War. He was Colonel of the 10th Regiment of Hussars between 1806 and 1809, before being promoted to general of brigade. He led the French Hussars as they charged the Spanish army's left flank at the Battle of the Gebora, and attacked the village of Albuera, along with Nicolas Godinot's infantry, at the Battle of Albuera on 16 May 1811.

== Spain ==
In March 1809, Marshal Édouard Mortier ordered Colonel Briche to take a regiment of cavalry from Aragon and make contact with the French VII Corps operating in Catalonia. This was in order to open communications with Laurent Gouvion Saint-Cyr, the VII Corps commander. Briche moved quickly and enjoyed some good luck. He took his horsemen on a route between Lerida and Mequinenza, finally making contact with Louis François Jean Chabot's division in the coastal plains. On his return trip back to Mortier with news of the VII Corps, Briche was attacked by swarms of miquelets, the Catalan militia, and abandoned his mission. Briche took refuge with Chabot's division, but Mortier remained unaware of his fate.
