= José Imaz =

Spanish military officer

José Imaz Altolaguirre (1761–1828) was a Spanish military commander during the Peninsular War.

== Early career ==
In 1780, Imaz enlisted in the Regimiento Real de Lima, Peru, and saw active service in the campaign against Túpac Amaru. In 1782 he was promoted to second lieutenant.

Returning to Spain in 1784, he transferred to the Soria Infantry Regiment as a cadet, being promoted to lieutenant in 1789. From September 1790 to July 1791 he was stationed at the besieged city of Ceuta. He was promoted to captain the following August, seeing action in several combats in Portugal.

== Peninsular War ==
=== Siege of Badajoz ===
Following the death of his commanding officer, Rafael Menacho, Imaz took command of the garrison. The following week, he called a council of war which decided to surrender to Mortier.

On the way to France as a prisoner of war, he was rescued by a group of guerrilleros and taken to Cartagena and from there by sea to Cádiz. He was arrested on landing and court-martialled, a process that lasted until 1813, and ending with him being absolved.

=== Oman's comments ===
Oman, in his A History of the Peninsular War, Vol. IV (1911), was especially critical of Imaz's surrender, summing it up as follows:

The worst part of his conduct was that he was aware that an army of succour was on the march to help him. For Badajoz had semaphore communication with Elvas, and on the preceding day the Portuguese General Leite had telegraphed to him, by Wellington’s orders, that Beresford had been detached with two divisions to hasten to his aid on March 8th. As a matter of fact, Beresford’s movement into Estremadura was retarded, and his corps did not move off for some days later, but Imaz did not know this, and he was certainly guilty of concealing from his officers that prompt succour had been promised, and was actually upon its way. The whole responsibility for the surrender falls on him, because he allowed Alvo, and the other voters for capitulation, to produce uncontradicted the statement that no relief was probable, while he knew himself that it had been promised. It is impossible to deny that this was pusillanimity reaching into and over the border of treason. (Oman 1911, pp. 60-61.)

Badajoz was found by the victors to contain rations for 8,000 men sufficient to last for over a month, more than 150 serviceable cannon, 80,000 lb. of powder, 300,000 infantry cartridges, and two bridge equipages. There is not the slightest doubt that if Menacho had lived the place would have held out till it was relieved by Beresford. For the latter, who was finally ordered to move to its relief on March 12th, would have reached its neighbourhood on the 18th. (Oman 1911, p. 61.)

== Post-war career ==
In 1815, Fernando VII appointed Imaz subinspector of the 4th Division of the Provincial Militias of Galicia, and in La Coruña he participated in quashing Juan Díaz Porlier's pronunciamiento.

In May 1819, Imaz was appointed commander general of Tuy, a post from which he was dismissed on 23 February 1820, following Rafael del Riego's uprising the previous month. Imaz was sent to barracks at Madrid and then to Andalusia. From there, in May 1826 he was sent to Valladolid, where he died in December 1828.
