= Santa Marta, Extremadura =

Municipality in the province of Badajoz, Spain

Coordinates: 38°37′0″N 6°37′0″W

Santa Marta
- municipality
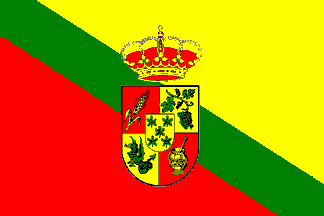
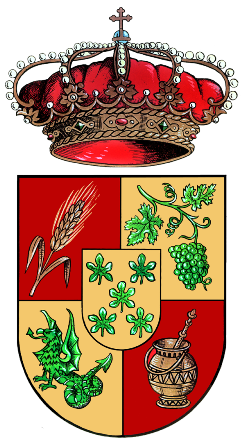
- Flag Coat of arms
- Interactive map of Santa Marta
- Country: Spain
- Autonomous community: Extremadura
- Province: Badajoz

Population (2025-01-01)
  - Total: 4,201
- Time zone: UTC+1 (CET)
  - Summer (DST): UTC+2 (CEST)

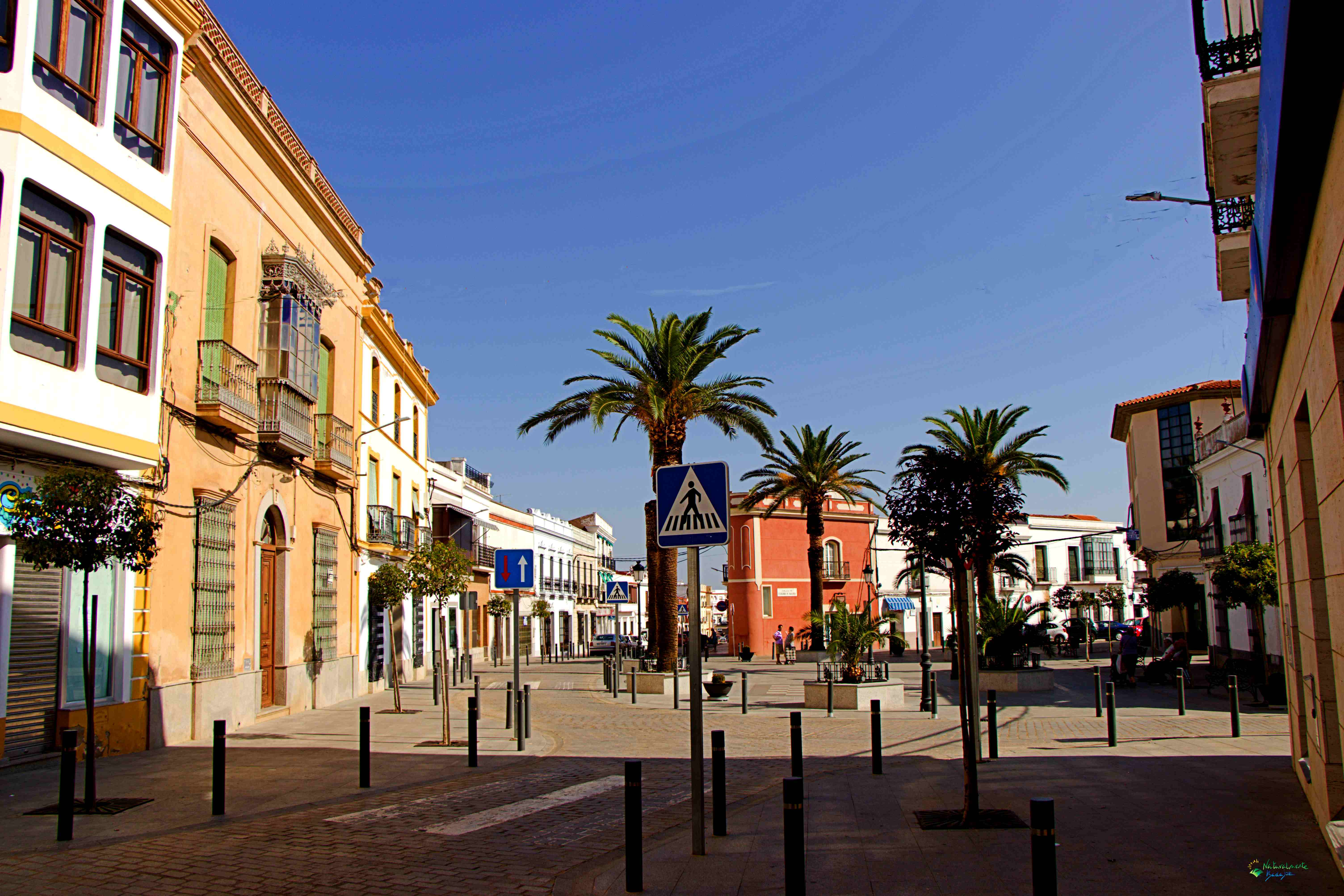
Plaza de las Palmeras in downtown Santa Marta

Santa Marta is a municipality (population 4,157) in the Spanish province of Badajoz, in the autonomous community of Extremadura.

== See also ==
- List of municipalities in Badajoz
