= Gabriel de Mendizábal =

Spanish army officer (1765–1838)

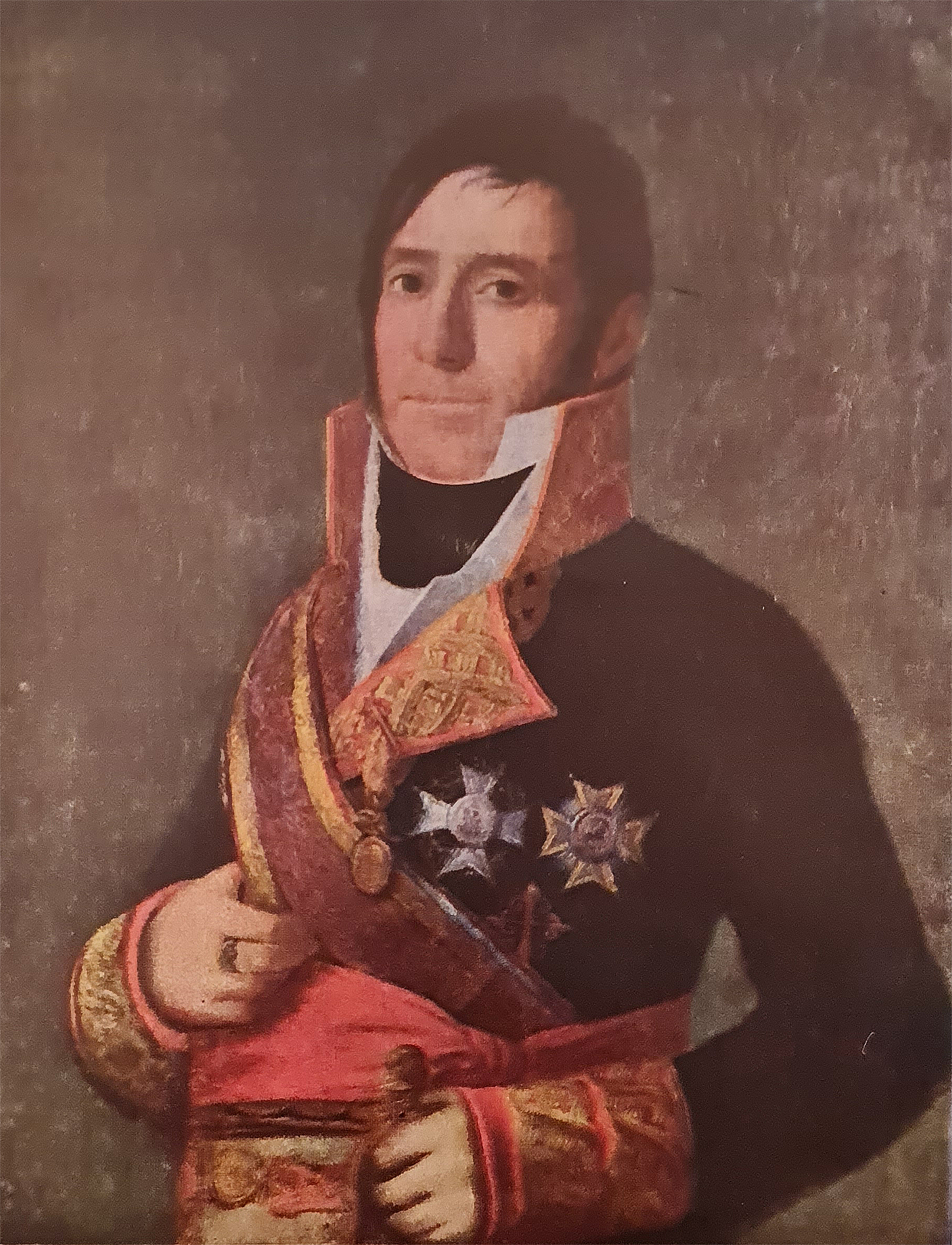
- Portrait of General Gabriel de Mendizábal by Francisco Goya (1813)
- Born: 14 May 1765; Bergara, Gipuzkoa, Spain
- Died: 1 September 1838 (aged 73) Madrid
- Conflicts: War of the Pyrenees; Peninsular War; Battle of the Gebora; Battle of San Marcial

Gabriel María de Mendizábal Yraeta, 1st Count of Cuadro de Alba de Tormes (also Iraeta by his maternal name; 14 May 1765 – 1 September 1838) was a Spanish general officer.

== Military career ==
He first saw action during the War of the Pyrenees. Mendizábal fought on the Basque-Navarrese and Catalan fronts.

Promoted to captain in 1791, in 1794 as a sergeant major, and second in command of the Battalion of Volunteers of Guipúzcoa he saw action in several battles under General Ricardos.

In 1793, he was promoted to the rank of colonel and was given command of a new regiment, the Voluntarios de Burgos posted to the north of Portugal. Due to the Spanish military disaster at Irún at the end of the Battle of the Baztan Valley in 1794, he was transferred to western Gipuzkoa with the inferior rank of First Comandante. On 2 December 1794, he commanded a joint Álavan, Gipuzkoan and Biscayan militia to achieve a victory in his home town of Bergara over French troops.

In 1802, Mendizábal was again promoted to the rank of colonel and given the command of a regiment of volunteers from Navarre. On 23 September 1804, he entered Bilbao at the head of his troops to put an end to a series of riots collectively known as the Zamacolada.

=== Peninsular War ===
In April 1809, Mendizábal was promoted to mariscal de campo, for his action at Villafranca del Bierzo (March). Later that year, he was granted the title of count of Cuadro de Alba de Tormes, for his military achievements against the French cavalry. In 1810, he was promoted to lieutenant general for his actions in the Basque Provinces.

He was appointed commander of the Army of the Left and suffered a defeat at the Battle of the Gebora after which he was kept from command. Humiliated, Mendizábal begged to serve as a simple rank and file soldier, a request that was granted. After distinguishing himself at the Battle of Albuera in May 1811, he was reinstated with the title of Commander of the Seventh Army or Séptimo Exército, which he took to the north of Spain in the territories that make up the Basque Provinces (Biscay), Navarre, La Rioja, Burgos, and Santander. He fought in this mountainous region using guerrilla tactics.

On 16 December 1812, Mendizábal was named political chief of the Seigneury of Biscay. He called the acting Council of Biscay which, in the wake of the approval of a new Constitution in Cádiz, sent a task force to the city with a negotiation mandate. In the final phases of the war, on 31 August 1813, he controlled a division at the Battle of San Marcial. For his actions, he was decorated with the highest military honors of the Laureate Cross of Saint Ferdinand, and the Laureate of the Royal and Military Order of Saint Hermenegild.

== Politics ==
Between 1814 and 1820, he gained political power as a member of the Consejo Supremo de la Guerra. In 1834, he was named president of the Tribunal Supremo de Guerra y Marina, a position he held until his death in 1838.
