= A History of the Peninsular War =

Non-fiction work about the Peninsular War

- Volume 1 book jacket, 1st edition
- Author: Sir Charles Oman
- Subject: History, Napoleonic Wars
- Genre: Non-fiction
- Publisher: Clarendon Press (1st edition), Greenhill Books (republished), Stackpole Books (republished)
- Publication date: 1902-1930, 1995-1997, 2004 (paperback)
- Publication place: United Kingdom
- Media type: Print, e book, world wide web
- ISBN: 9781853672149
- OCLC: 264957178
- Website: The Napoleon Series

A History of the Peninsular War is a seven-volume non-fiction scholarly historical work written by Sir Charles Oman, covering the Peninsular War (1807-1814) in the Iberian Peninsula during the Napoleonic Wars. Clarendon Press published the first volume in 1902 and volume seven in 1930.

== About the seven volumes ==
This seven-volume history is described as appealing, scholarly, thorough, and definitive. The author does acknowledge politics and diplomacy throughout, but the main narrative focus is on military events. Additionally, human beings on the field are the focus rather than military units "with numerical designations." The books present equal analysis to all the powers involved in the seven-year conflict. Many of the important actors and decision makers in the armies of Spain, Portugal, the United Kingdom and the First French Empire are included. Oman's writing style is late Victorian, cleverly humorous, and genial in places, demonstrating a facility for story-telling. Meanwhile, he ensures the pertinent facts of the many covered events are presented.

Regarding scholarship, Oman went "through everything available" and then dug for more, discovering diaries, memoirs, military dispatches, general orders, "parliamentary papers", filed newspapers, pertinent national archives, and so on. He personally reconnoitered relevant geographical areas enabling him to give first-hand descriptions of the topography. Also, Oman's "studies of personalities and their thought processes, [has revealed] the depth of his research."

Oman is widely perceived as unbiased with his coverage. In fact, one of his main objectives for writing this history was to counter Sir William Napier's seemingly flawed recounting of events in Napier's own six-volume work, History of the War in the Peninsula and the South of France from the Year 1807 to the Year 1814 (published 1828-1840) Oman perceived Napier's account as heavily biased, exaggerating Spanish defeats and minimizing Spanish successes, while also diminishing entrenched Spanish resistance which frustrated the Duke of Wellington. Napier had a high regard for Napoleon while at the same time being critical of the Spanish. Oman also stated that another reason for creating his historical account was the very large amount of source material that had become available since the publication of Napier's work.

Producing this seven-volume history spanned nearly thirty years and it demonstrated Oman's unflagging "industry, perseverance, and volume of reading." He personally reconnoitered the "very scene[s] of action [of] nearly all Wellington's battlefields." Appendices, lists of casualties, and clearly illustrated maps complete this endeavor. Godfrey Davies, in his book Wellington's Army, pointed out weaknesses in Oman's work in regard to his estimates of Wellington as a general and Wellington's relations with his officers and men.

== Chronology ==
This history was published between 1902 and 1930 in seven volumes:

- Volume 1 was published in 1902. It covers the years 1807–1809. It is entitled " Treaty of Fontainebleau to Corunna. " 673 pages. Free download at https://www.gutenberg.org/ebooks/53264
- Volume 2 was published in 1903. Coverage includes January to September 1809 and is entitled " Corunna to end of Talavera campaign. " 670 pages. Free download at https://www.gutenberg.org/ebooks/54279
- Volume 3 was published in 1908. It covers September 1809 to December 1810 and is entitled " Ocana, Cadiz, Bussaco, Torres Vedras. " 575 pages. Free download at https://www.gutenberg.org/ebooks/55231
- Volume 4 was published in 1911. It covers December 1810 to December 1811 and is entitled " Massséna's retreat, Fuentes de Onoro, Albuera, Tarragon " 672 pages. Free download at https://www.gutenberg.org/ebooks/56812
- Volume 5 was published in 1914. It covers October 1811 to August 1812, and is entitled "Valencia, Ciudad Rodrigo, Badajoz, Salamanca, Madrid." 642 pages. Free download at https://www.gutenberg.org/ebooks/62291
- Volume 6 was published in 1922. Coverage encompasses the beginning of September 1812 to the beginning of August 1813. It is entitled "Siege of Burgos, retreat from Burgos, Vittoria, Pyrenees." 790 pages. Free download here https://archive.org/details/historyofpeninsu06oman
- Volume 7 was published in 1930. Coverage includes August 1813 to the middle of April 1814. It is entitled St Sebastian, invasion of France, Nivelle...

Greenhill Books of London and Stackpole Books of Pennsylvania republished all seven volumes between 1995 and 1997.

== Wellington's army ==
Within the first nine years of researching and writing this history, Oman had also gathered other notes and materials that only tangentially correlated to "A History of the Peninsular War." As he decided not to use this material for the seven-volume history, he used it to write "Wellington's Army 1809-1814" (originally published in 1913.) This book includes the "organization, day-by-day life, and psychology" of Wellington's Army during the Peninsular War.
