= La Albuera =

- Municipality
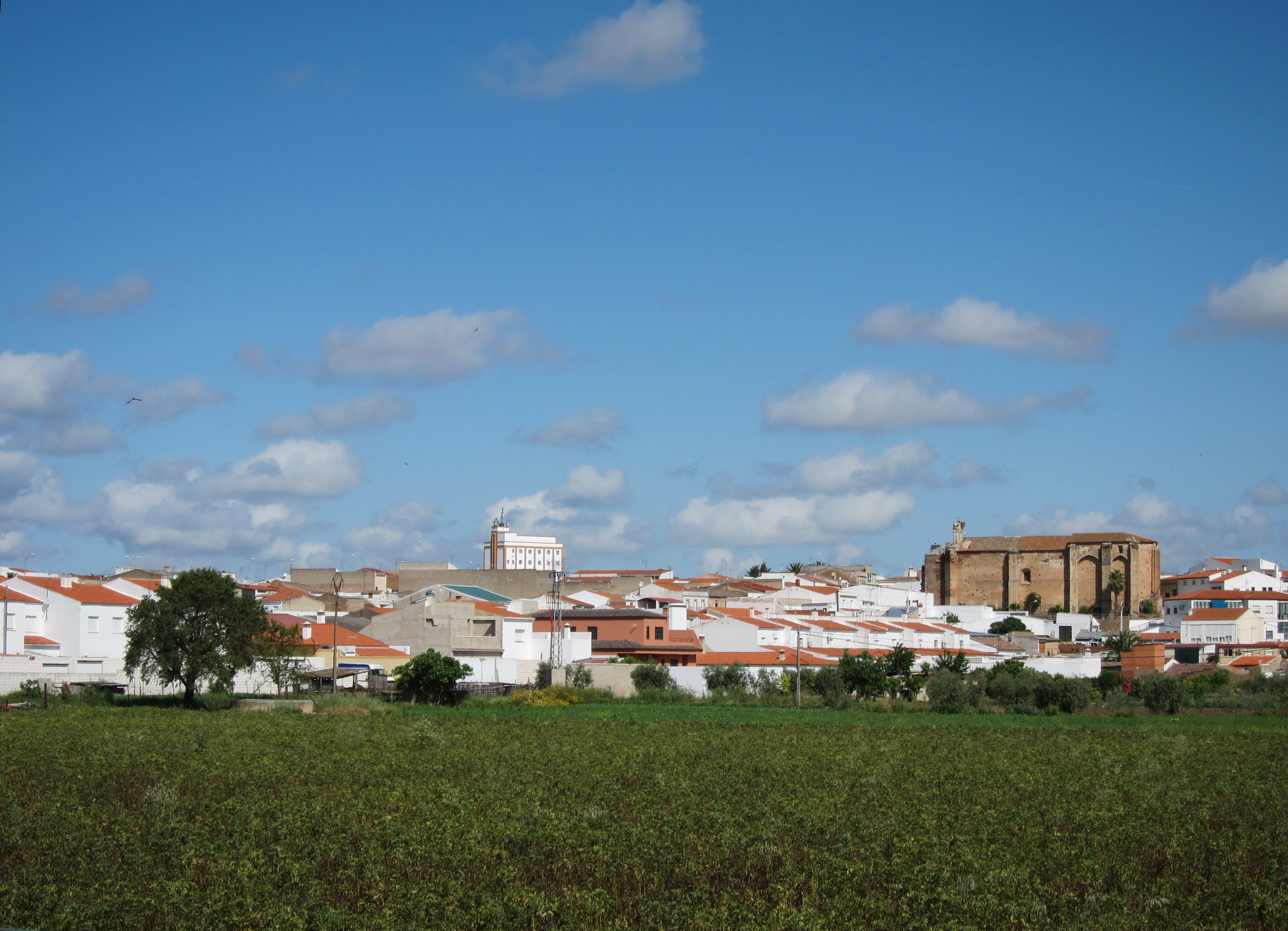

- Coat of arms

- Location of La Albuera within Extremadura
- Coordinates: 38°42′58″N 6°49′26″W
- Country: Spain
- Autonomous community: Extremadura
- Province: Badajoz
- Comarca: Tierra de Badajoz
- Judicial district: Badajoz

Government
  - Mayor: Manuel Antonio Díaz González (PSOE)

Area
  - Total: 26.4 km^{2} (10.2 sq mi)
- Elevation: 253 m (830 ft)

Population (2025-01-01)
  - Total: 1,995
  - Density: 75.6/km^{2} (196/sq mi)
- Demonym: Albuereños
- Time zone: UTC+1 (CET)
  - Summer (DST): UTC+2 (CEST)
- Postal code: 06170
- Website: Official website

La Albuera is a village southeast of Badajoz, Extremadura, Spain. As of 2009 it had a population of c. 2,000 inhabitants.

== History ==
It was scene of the Battle of Albuera (16 May 1811) between Spanish, Portuguese and British troops under William Carr Beresford and the French ones led by Marshal Soult, in the course of the Peninsular War.

== Geography ==
Located south of the city of Badajoz and next to the Spanish borders with Portugal, La Albuera is, along with Guadiana del Caudillo, an enclave entirely surrounded by the municipal territory of Badajoz.

== Twin towns ==
- Descartes, France

== See also ==
- List of municipalities in Badajoz
