= Alcazaba of Badajoz =

Citadel in Badajoz, Spain

- Alcazaba de Badajoz
- Badajoz, Spain
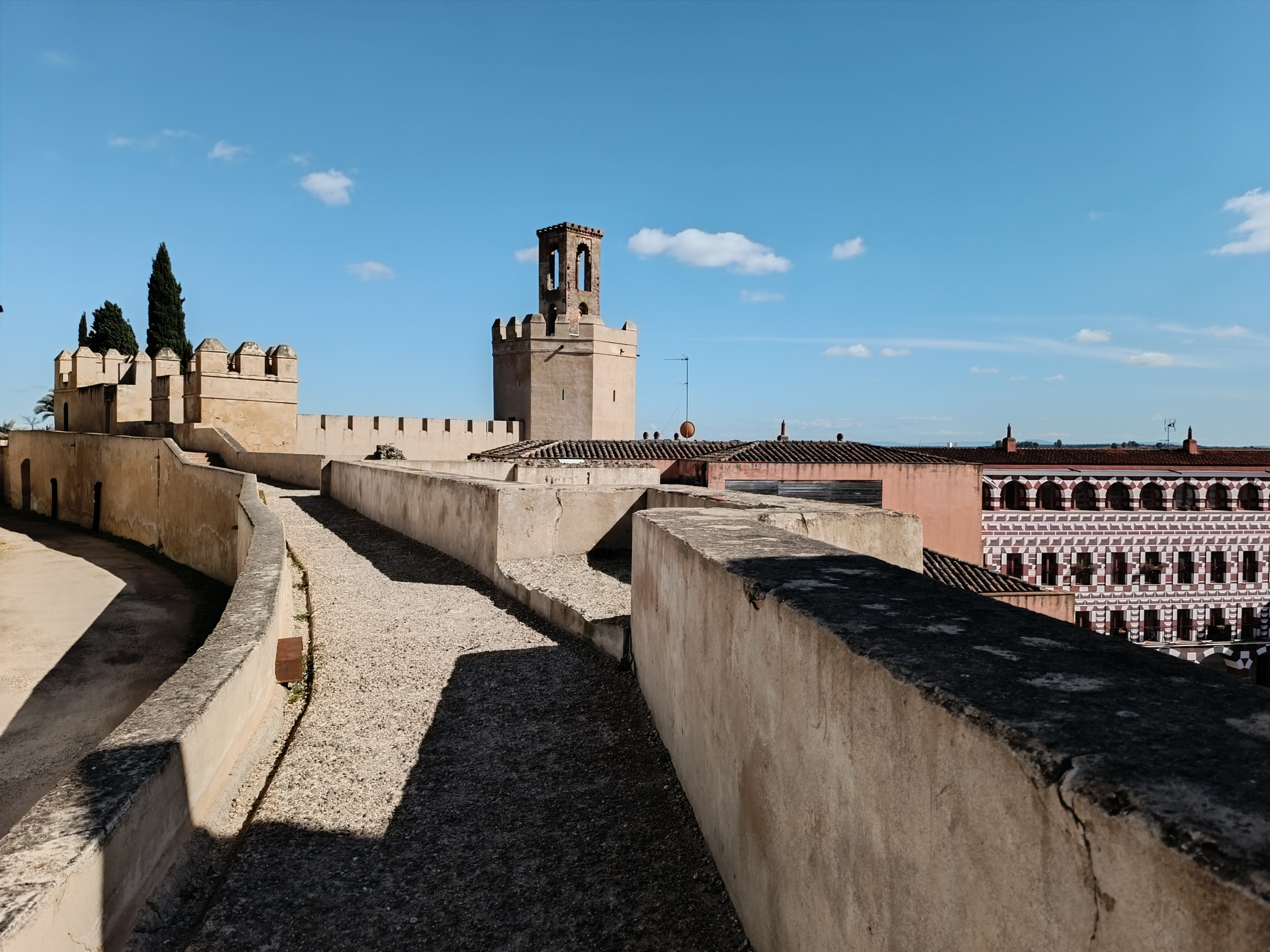
- The Alcazaba of Badajoz

Site information
- Type: Fortress
- Open to the public: yes
- Condition: Partially restored

Location
- Badajoz
- Coordinates: 38.8828°N 6.9683°W

Site history
- Built: 9th century
- Built by: Almohads

The Alcazaba of Badajoz is an ancient Moorish citadel in Badajoz, Extremadura, western Spain. The alcazaba, as it now appears, was built by the Almohads in the 12th century, although it probably existed from the 9th century, when Badajoz was founded. In the 11th and 12th centuries, it was the residence of the taifa of Badajoz rulers.

It was declared a national monument of Spain in 1931.

== History ==
Badajoz was founded by Abd-al Rahman Ibn Marwan in 875. After leading several rebellions, he was expelled from Mérida but allowed to find a new city. He built a large citadel on a hill commanding the new city, thereby granting Badajoz a strategic role in controlling the passage from Portugal to central Iberia.

The current line of walls dates mostly from the Almohad age, although there are traces of earlier work from 913 and 1030; in 1169, the Almohad caliph Abu Yaqub Yusuf rebuilt the fortress, giving it its current appearance. Abu Yahya ibn Abi Sinan carried out the last Muslim restoration in the 13th century, a few years before the city's capture by the Christian King Alfonso IX of León.

During the Peninsular War (1807–1814), the citadel was successfully stormed by allied British, Spanish and Portuguese forces under the command of the Duke of Wellington. As a result, the Napoleonic hold on Western Spain was significantly weakened, and the storming of the Alcazaba became part of Wellington's growing reputation for success in battle.

== Description ==
The citadel measures 400 by 200 metres (1,310 ft × 660 ft) and is bounded to the north by the Guadiana river and to the east by the Rivillas torrent. Towers defend the less steep parts of the slopes and other strategically weak points. The whole line of walls features a parapet, while the barbican and the ditch, which once added protection, have disappeared.

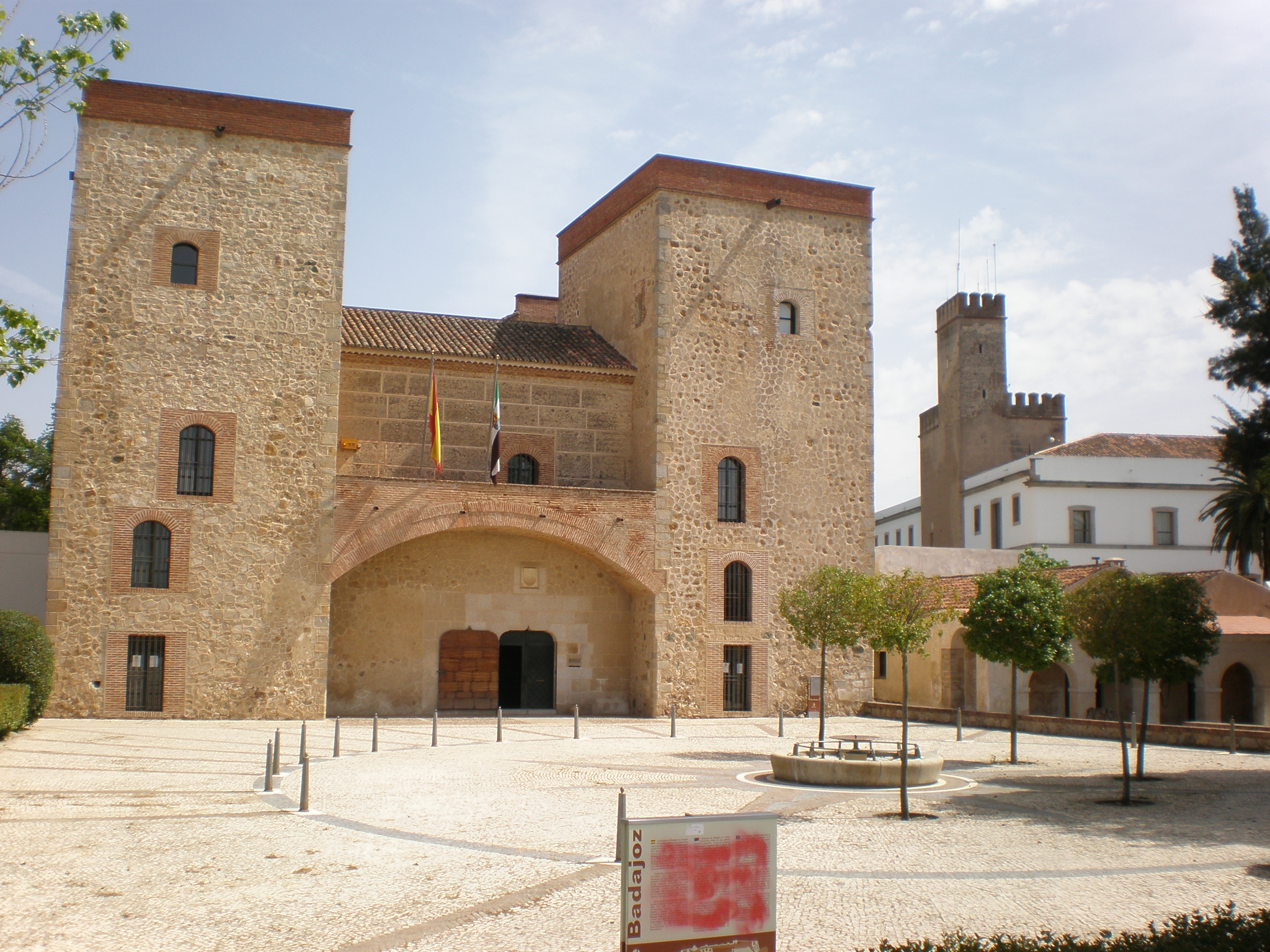
Palace of the Dukes of Feria

In the towers area was the palace of the lords of Badajoz, featuring several baths and mosques. After the Christian conquest, the largest, the Great Mosque, was turned into a church, Santa María de Calatrava, which acted as the cathedral of Badajoz until the construction of the current cathedral. The Great Mosque had five naves separated by arches supported by columns, and external buttresses. For its construction elements of Roman and Visigoth edifices were used, such as capitals and columns. Another building of the Muslim palace, which was converted after the Christian conquest, was the military Hospital, now home to the Library of Extremadura.

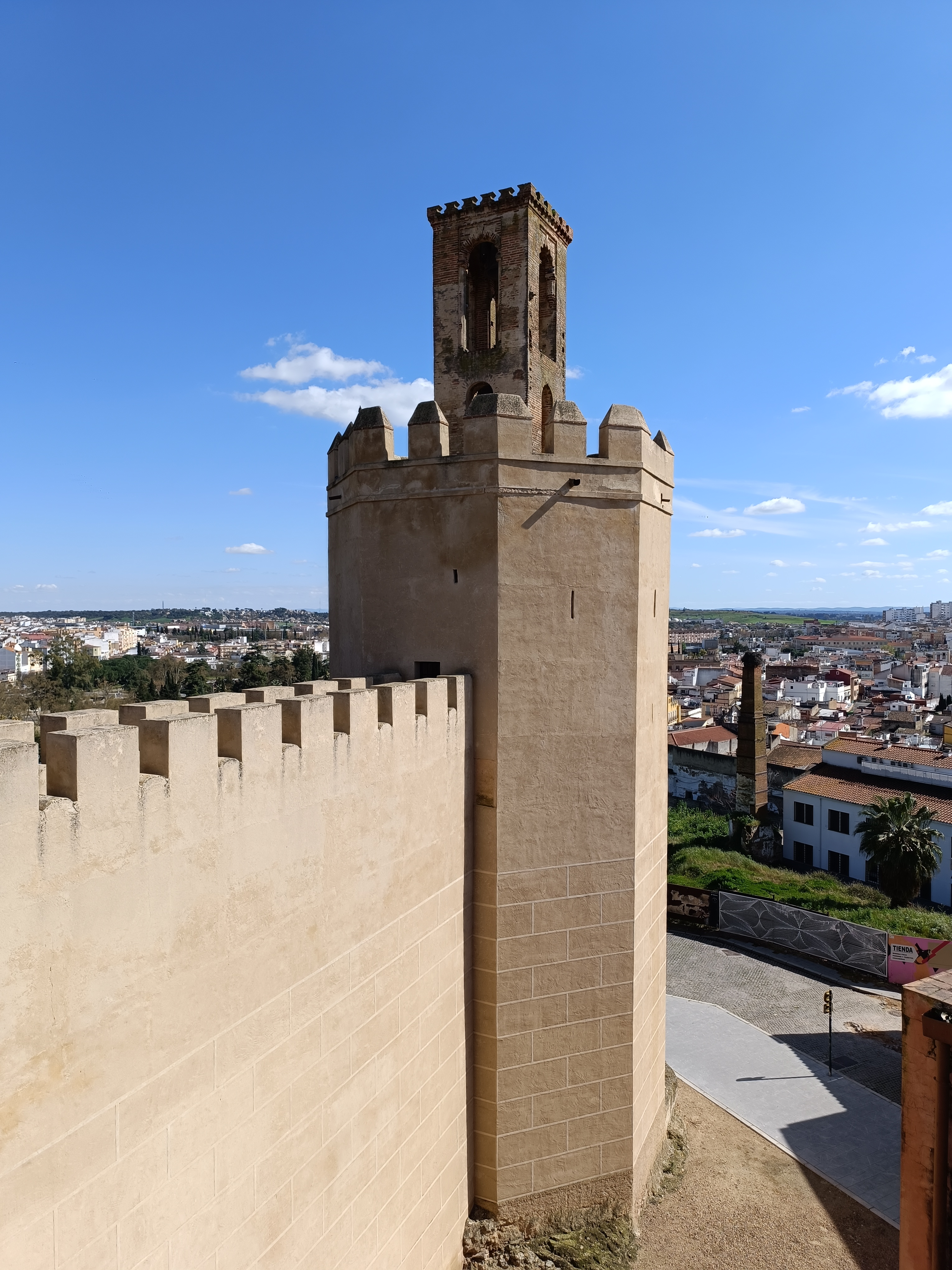
Espantaperros Tower, or Atalaya Tower

Another building in the Alcazaba is the Palace of the Dukes of Feria, built by the Grand Master of the Order of Santiago, Lorenzo Suárez de Figeroa (1387–1410). Built in Renaissance style with Mudéjar elements, it was restored in the 17th century. The façade features a central arch connecting two square towers with irregularly placed windows; the palace has a trapezoidal plan and a cloister. It is currently home to the Provincial Archaeological Museum.

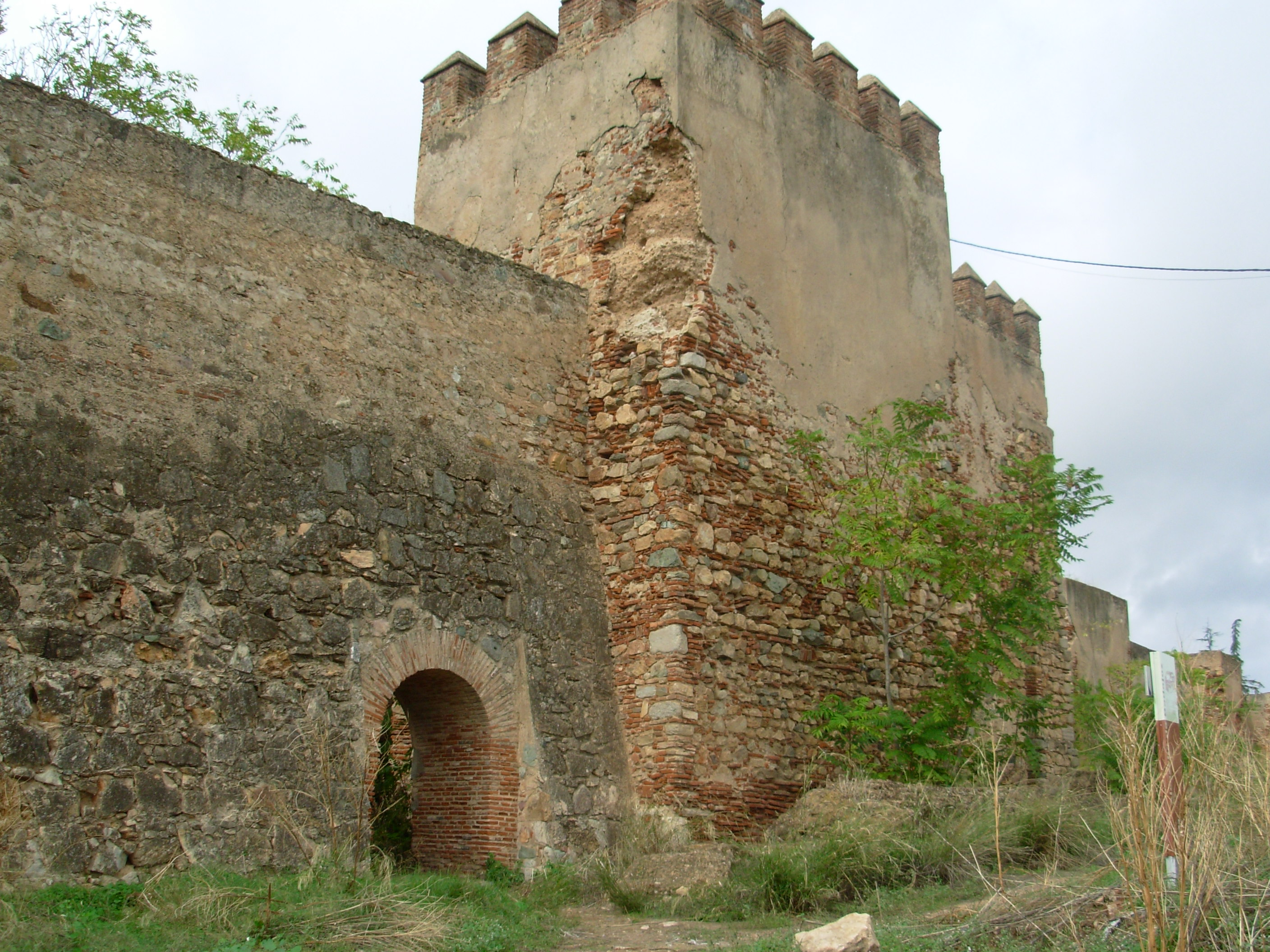
Alpéndiz Tower and Gate

Among the towers, the most significant is the Espantaperros Tower (Spanish: Torre de Espantaperros or Torre de la Atalaya), built in 1169 and with a height of 30 metres (98 ft). It has an octagonal plan and is surmounted by a small temple added in Mudéjar style in the 16th century.

Other towers include:

- Torre de las Siete Ventanas
- Torre de las Doncellas
- Torre del Alpéndiz
- Torre Abarlongada
- Torre de la Horca or Torre de los Ahorcados
- Torre de Santa María, the most visible remains of the ancient cathedral
- Torre del Palacio Episcopal (Bishop's Palace Tower)

Gates include:

- Puerta del Capitel, one of the two original Almohad gates, which has been preserved
- Puerta de Yelves o de Carros
- Puerta del Alpéndiz, on the northern side of the citadel
- Puerta de la Coraxa or Puerta de la Traición

The Alcazaba also includes a large park.

== See also ==
- Taifa of Badajoz
- Badajoz bastioned enclosure
