= Royal Bridge (Badajoz) =

Bridge in Spain

Royal Bridge Puente Real
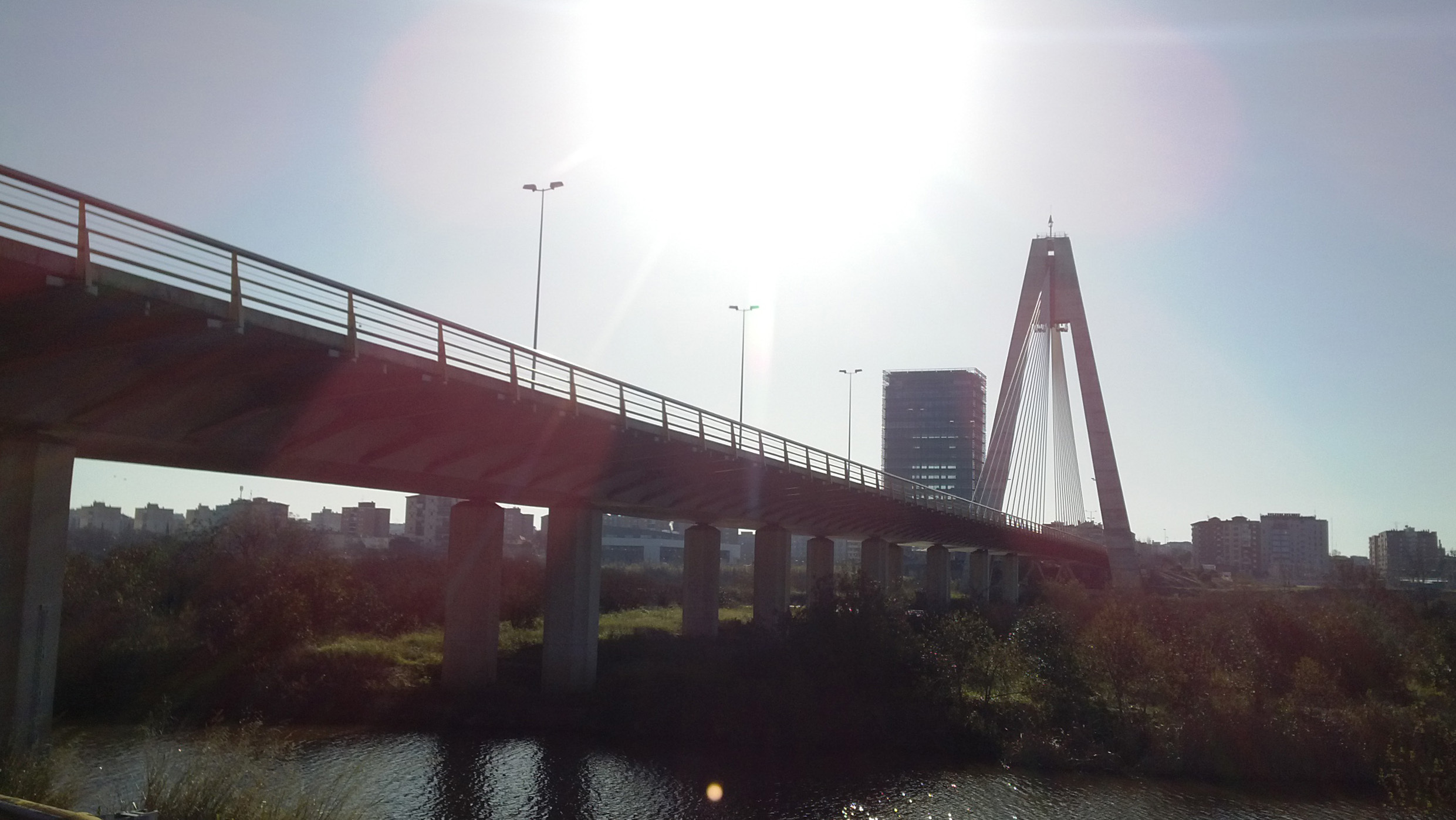
- Coordinates: 38°52′33″N 6°59′34″W
- Crosses: Guadiana
- Locale: Badajoz, Spain

Characteristics
- Design: Cable-stayed bridge
- Total length: 452 m
- Width: 23 m
- Height: 81.20 m
- Longest span: 136 m

History
- Opened: 23 December 1994

Location
- Interactive map of Royal Bridge

The Royal Bridge (Spanish: Puente Real) is a bridge in Badajoz, Spain. It crosses over the Guadiana.

Promoted by the Junta de Extremadura, the foundation stone was laid on 28 September 1992. The project consists of a cable-stayed bridge over the Guadiana with the following spans: (136 + 88 + 32) m. The bridge is continued by a viaduct displaying six spans of 32 m, making a total length of 452 m. The bridge platform, with two lanes in each direction, has a width of 23 m. The main pylon, made of reinforced concrete, stands 81.20 m high. It features 28 tension cables.

It was opened on 23 December 1994. Following its inauguration, it became the busiest bridge in the municipality.
