= Rodrigo Dosma =

Rodrigo Dosma was a Spanish humanist from Badajoz, active during the late 16th century and early 17th century. He authored works such as De authoritate Sacrae. Scripturae. Libri III in 1594 and Expositio, sive Paraphrasis in sacros centum quinquaginta Psalmos in 1601.
