= Herguijuela =

- municipality
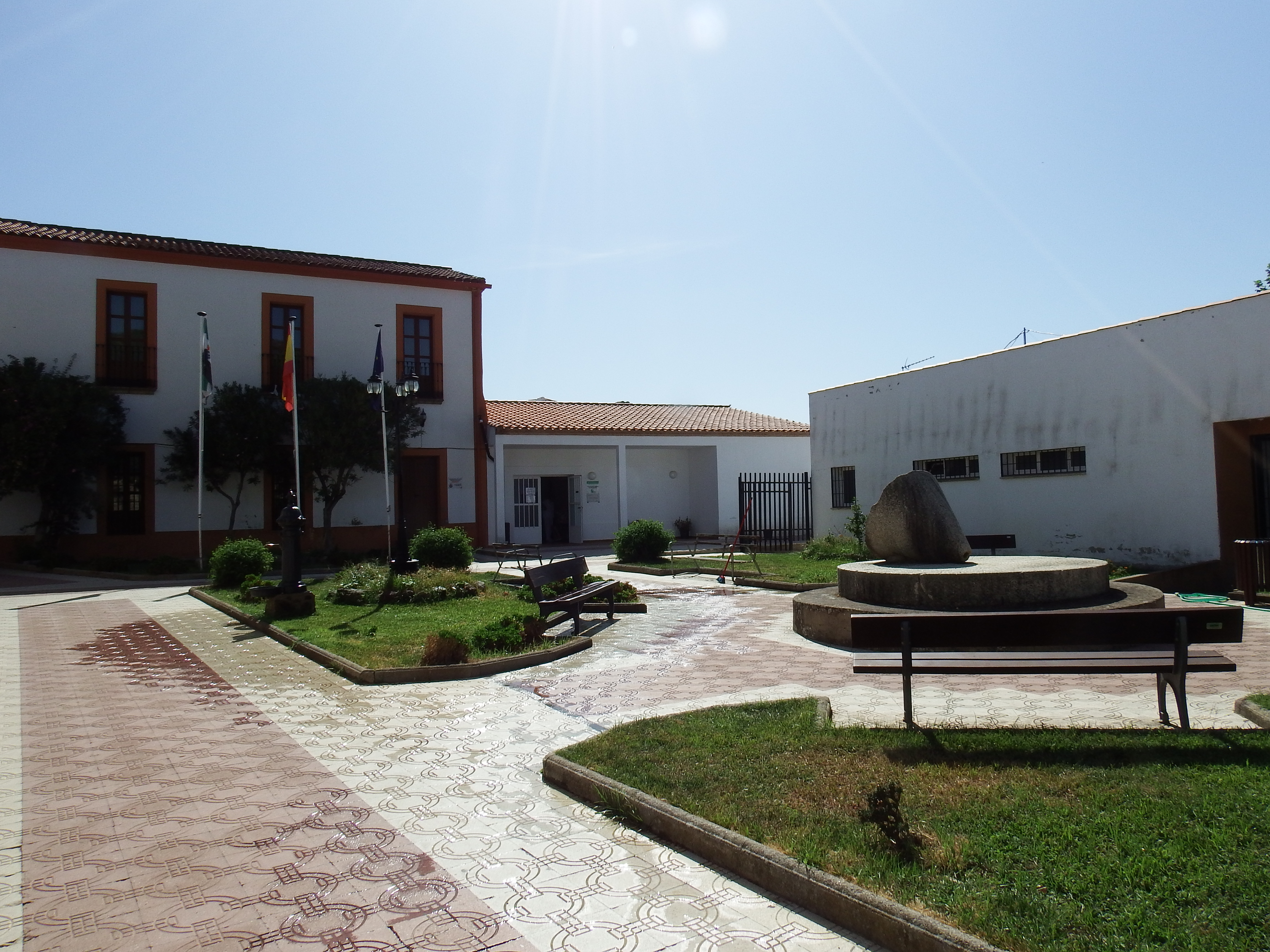
- Town hall

- Coat of arms

- Location in Spain.
- Coordinates: 39°23′N 5°46′W
- Country: Spain
- Autonomous community: Extremadura
- Province: Cáceres
- Comarca: Tierra de Trujillo

Government
  - Mayor: Lesmes Chamorro Barquilla

Area
  - Total: 41.97 km^{2} (16.20 sq mi)

Population (2025-01-01)
  - Total: 264
  - Density: 6.29/km^{2} (16.3/sq mi)
- Demonym: Herguijueleños
- Time zone: UTC+1 (CET)
  - Summer (DST): UTC+2 (CEST)
- Postal code: 10230

Herguijuela (Spanish pronunciation: [eɾɣiˈxwela]) is a municipality located in the province of Cáceres, Extremadura, western Spain.

== See also ==
- List of municipalities in Cáceres
