= Conquista de la Sierra =

Coordinates: 39°21′N 5°44′W

- municipality
- Flag Coat of arms
- Interactive map of Conquista de la Sierra
- Country: Spain
- Autonomous community: Extremadura
- Province: Cáceres
- Municipality: Conquista de la Sierra

Area
  - Total: 41.77 km^{2} (16.13 sq mi)

Population (2025-01-01)
  - Total: 193
  - Density: 4.62/km^{2} (12.0/sq mi)
- Time zone: UTC+1 (CET)
  - Summer (DST): UTC+2 (CEST)

Conquista de la Sierra is a municipality located in the province of Cáceres, Extremadura, Spain. According to the 2006 census (INE), the municipality has a population of 220 inhabitants.

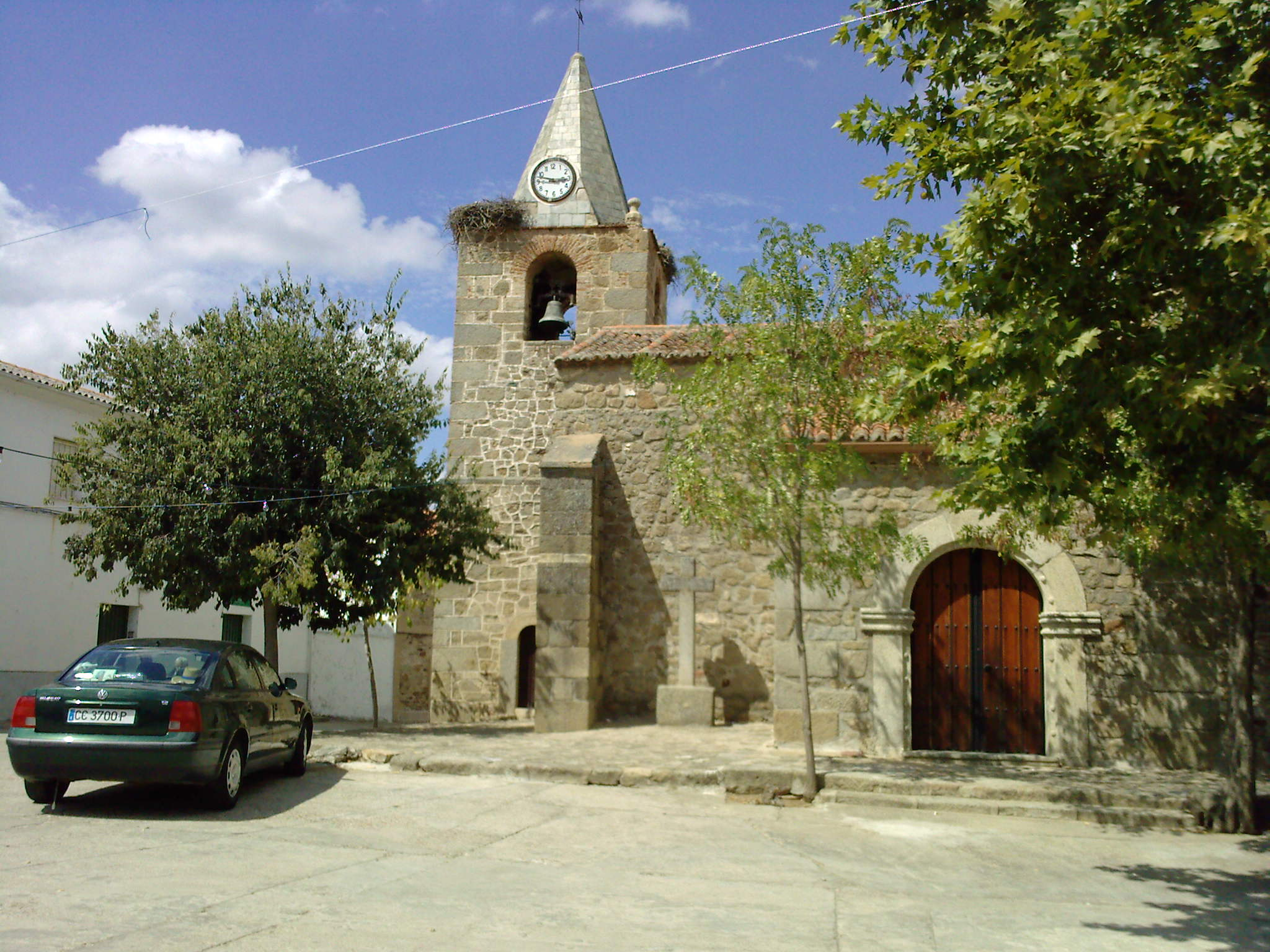
Church of Conquista de la Sierra, Cáceres province, Spain

== See also ==
- List of municipalities in Cáceres
