= Valdehúncar =

Valdehúncar, Spain
- Municipality
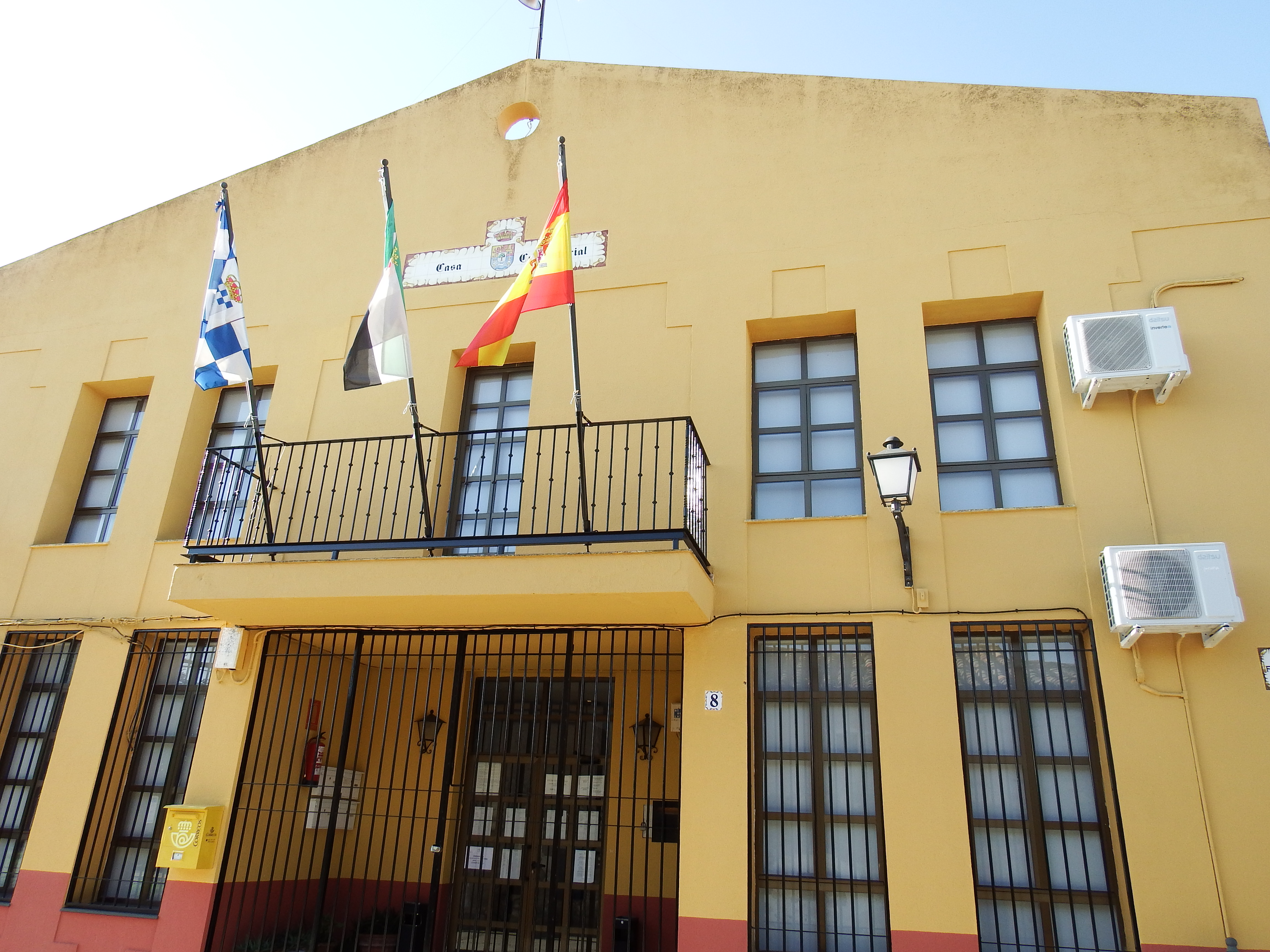
- Valdehúncar Town Hall

- Flag Coat of arms
- Interactive map of Valdehúncar, Spain
- Coordinates: 39°50′N 5°31′W
- Country: Spain
- Autonomous community: Extremadura
- Province: Cáceres
- Municipality: Valdehúncar

Area
  - Total: 26 km^{2} (10 sq mi)
- Elevation: 368 m (1,207 ft)

Population (2025-01-01)
  - Total: 188
  - Density: 7.2/km^{2} (19/sq mi)
- Time zone: UTC+1 (CET)
  - Summer (DST): UTC+2 (CEST)

Valdehúncar (Spanish pronunciation: [baldeˈuŋkaɾ]) is a municipality located in the province of Cáceres, Extremadura, Spain. According to the 2005 census (INE), the municipality has a population of 198 inhabitants.

== See also ==
- List of municipalities in Cáceres
