= Villamesías =

Coordinates: 39°15′N 5°52′W

Villamesías, Spain
- municipality
- Coat of arms
- Interactive map of Villamesías, Spain
- Country: Spain
- Autonomous community: Extremadura
- Province: Cáceres
- Municipality: Villamesías

Area
  - Total: 46 km^{2} (18 sq mi)

Population (2025-01-01)
  - Total: 271
  - Density: 5.9/km^{2} (15/sq mi)
- Time zone: UTC+1 (CET)
  - Summer (DST): UTC+2 (CEST)

Villamesías is a municipality located in the province of Cáceres, Extremadura, Spain. According to the 2006 census (INE), the municipality has a population of 344 inhabitants.

== History ==
A funerary inscription in Latin, dating between the 1st and 3rd centuries CE, was discovered in Villamesías. The epitaph commemorates Alucius Roscius, a Jewish freedman.

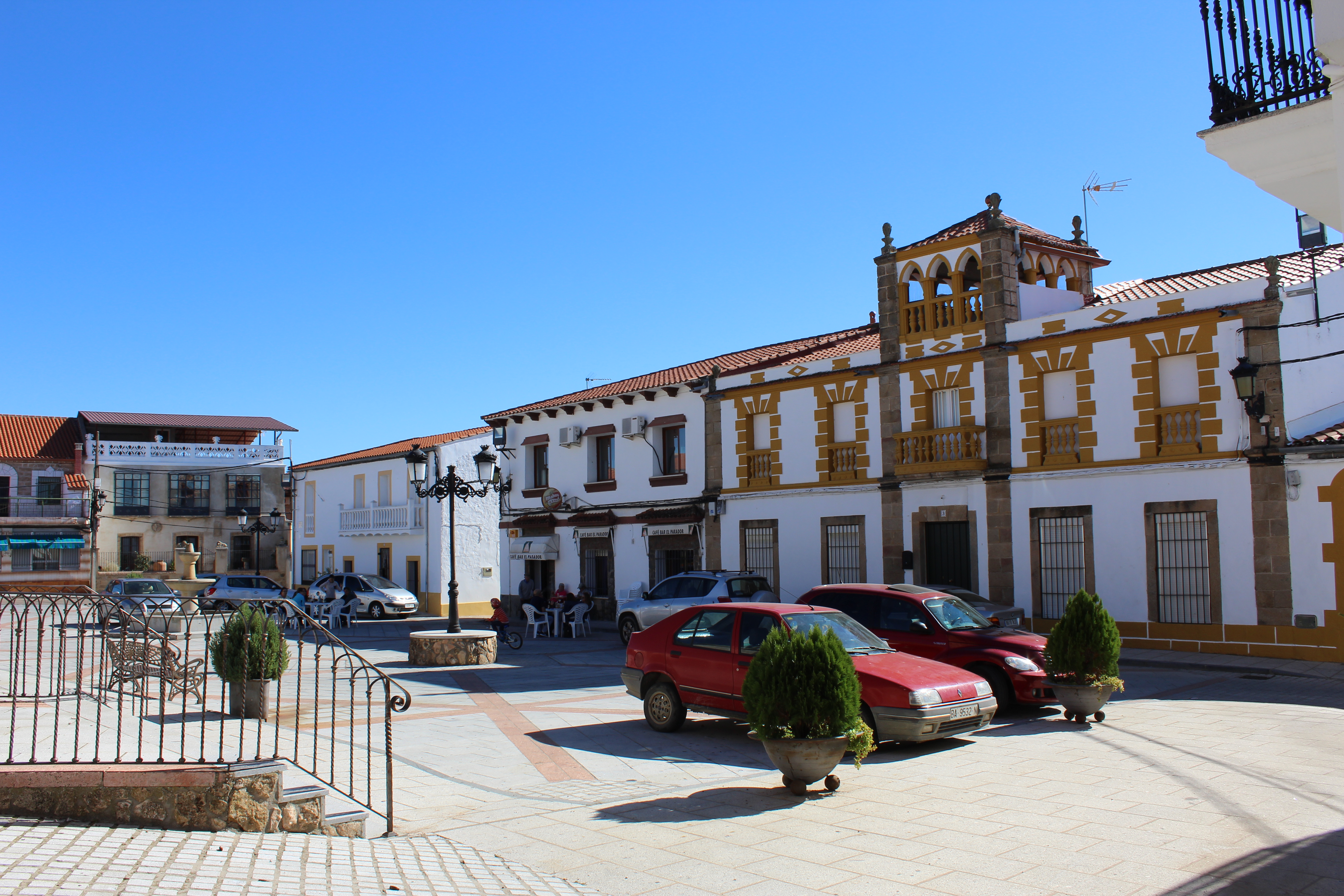
Town hall and plaza

== See also ==
- List of municipalities in Cáceres
