= Santiago del Campo =

Santiago del Campo, Spain
- municipality
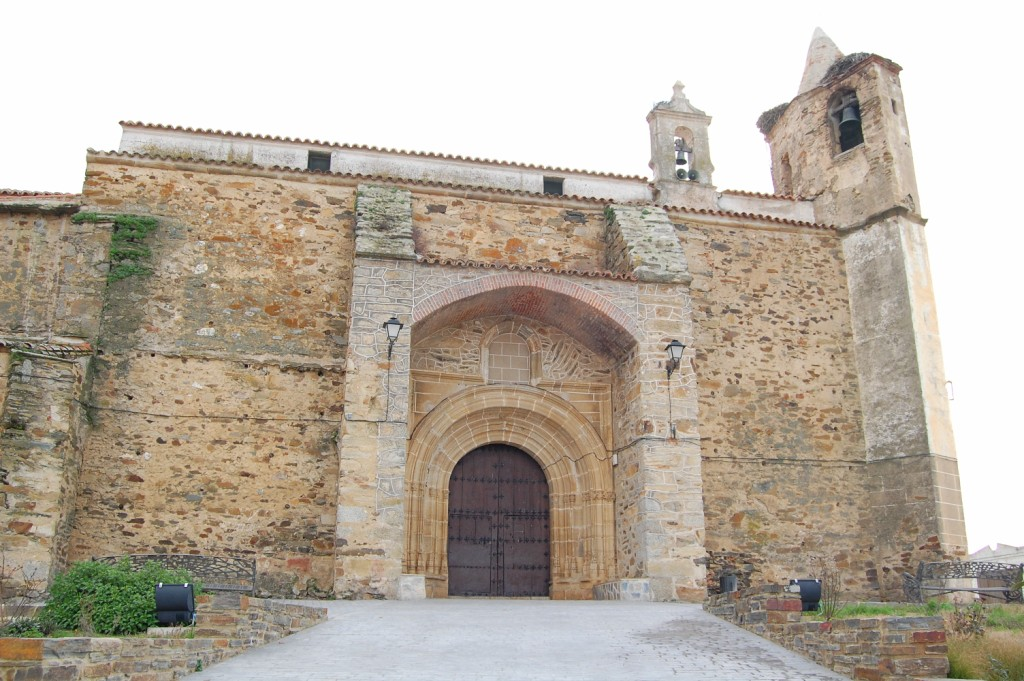
- Church of Santiago del campo

- Coat of arms
- Interactive map of Santiago del Campo, Spain
- Coordinates: 39°37′N 6°21′W
- Country: Spain
- Autonomous community: Extremadura
- Province: Cáceres
- Municipality: Santiago del Campo

Area
  - Total: 73 km^{2} (28 sq mi)
- Elevation: 349 m (1,145 ft)

Population (2025-01-01)
  - Total: 250
  - Density: 3.4/km^{2} (8.9/sq mi)
- Time zone: UTC+1 (CET)
  - Summer (DST): UTC+2 (CEST)

Santiago del Campo is a municipality located in the province of Cáceres, Extremadura, Spain. According to the 2006 census (INE), the municipality has a population of 323 inhabitants.

== See also ==
- List of municipalities in Cáceres
