= Robledillo de Trujillo =

Coordinates: 39°16′N 5°59′W

Robledillo de Trujillo, Spain
- municipality
- Flag Coat of arms
- Interactive map of Robledillo de Trujillo, Spain
- Country: Spain
- Autonomous community: Extremadura
- Province: Cáceres
- Municipality: Robledillo de Trujillo

Area
  - Total: 44 km^{2} (17 sq mi)

Population (2025-01-01)
  - Total: 394
  - Density: 9.0/km^{2} (23/sq mi)
- Time zone: UTC+1 (CET)
  - Summer (DST): UTC+2 (CEST)

Robledillo de Trujillo is a municipality located in the province of Cáceres, Extremadura, Spain. According to the 2006 census (INE), the municipality has a population of 454 inhabitants.

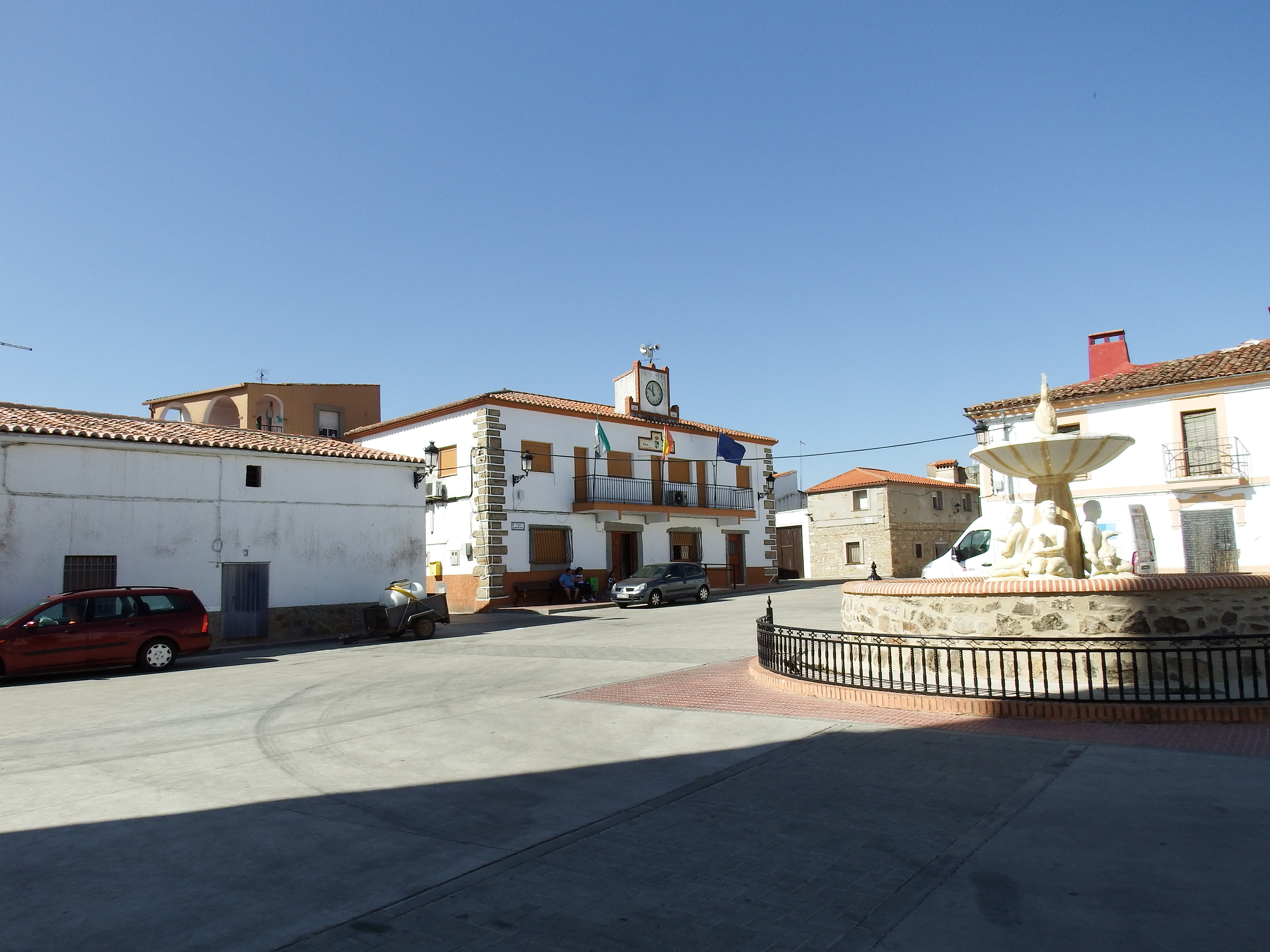
Robledillo de Trujillo Main Square

== See also ==
- List of municipalities in Cáceres
