= Pedroso de Acim =

- Municipality
- Flag Coat of arms

- Location in Spain.
- Coordinates: 39°49′N 6°24′W
- Country: Spain
- Autonomous community: Extremadura
- Province: Cáceres
- Comarca: Vegas del Alagón

Government
  - Mayor: Pedro Mallo

Area
  - Total: 33.23 km^{2} (12.83 sq mi)
- Elevation: 467 m (1,532 ft)

Population (2025-01-01)
  - Total: 90
  - Density: 2.7/km^{2} (7.0/sq mi)
- Demonym: Pedroseños
- Time zone: UTC+1 (CET)
  - Summer (DST): UTC+2 (CEST)

Pedroso de Acim is a municipality located in the province of Cáceres, Extremadura, Spain.

== See also ==
- List of municipalities in Cáceres
