= Alcollarín =

Coordinates: 39°15′N 5°44′W

Alcollarín, Spain
- city
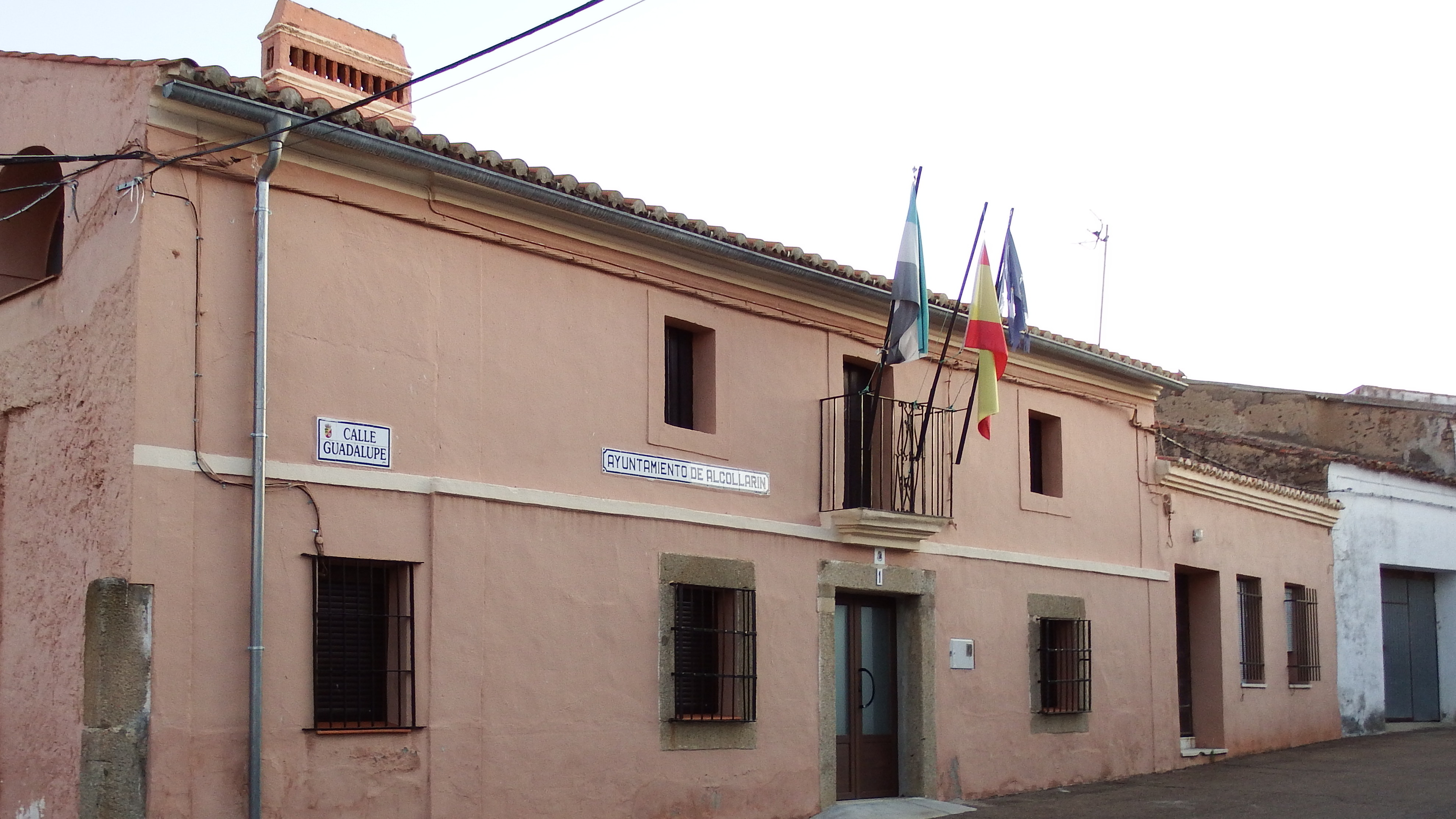

- Flag Coat of arms
- Interactive map of Alcollarín, Spain
- Country: Spain
- Autonomous community: Extremadura
- Province: Cáceres
- Municipality: Alcollarín

Area
  - Total: 79 km^{2} (31 sq mi)

Population (2025-01-01)
  - Total: 259
  - Density: 3.3/km^{2} (8.5/sq mi)
- Time zone: UTC+1 (CET)
  - Summer (DST): UTC+2 (CEST)

Alcollarín (Spanish pronunciation: [alkoʎaˈɾin]) is a municipality located in the province of Cáceres, Extremadura, Spain. According to the 2006 census (INE), the municipality has a population of 312 inhabitants.

== See also ==
- List of municipalities in Cáceres
