= Ruanes =

Coordinates: 39°20′N 6°00′W

Ruanes, Spain
- municipality
- Coat of arms
- Interactive map of Ruanes, Spain
- Country: Spain
- Autonomous community: Extremadura
- Province: Cáceres
- Municipality: Ruanes

Area
  - Total: 15 km^{2} (5.8 sq mi)

Population (2025-01-01)
  - Total: 82
  - Density: 5.5/km^{2} (14/sq mi)
- Time zone: UTC+1 (CET)
  - Summer (DST): UTC+2 (CEST)
- Website: http://www.telefonica.net/web2/ruanejos/

Ruanes is a municipality located in the province of Cáceres, Extremadura, Spain. According to the 2006 census (INE), the municipality has a population of 70 inhabitants.

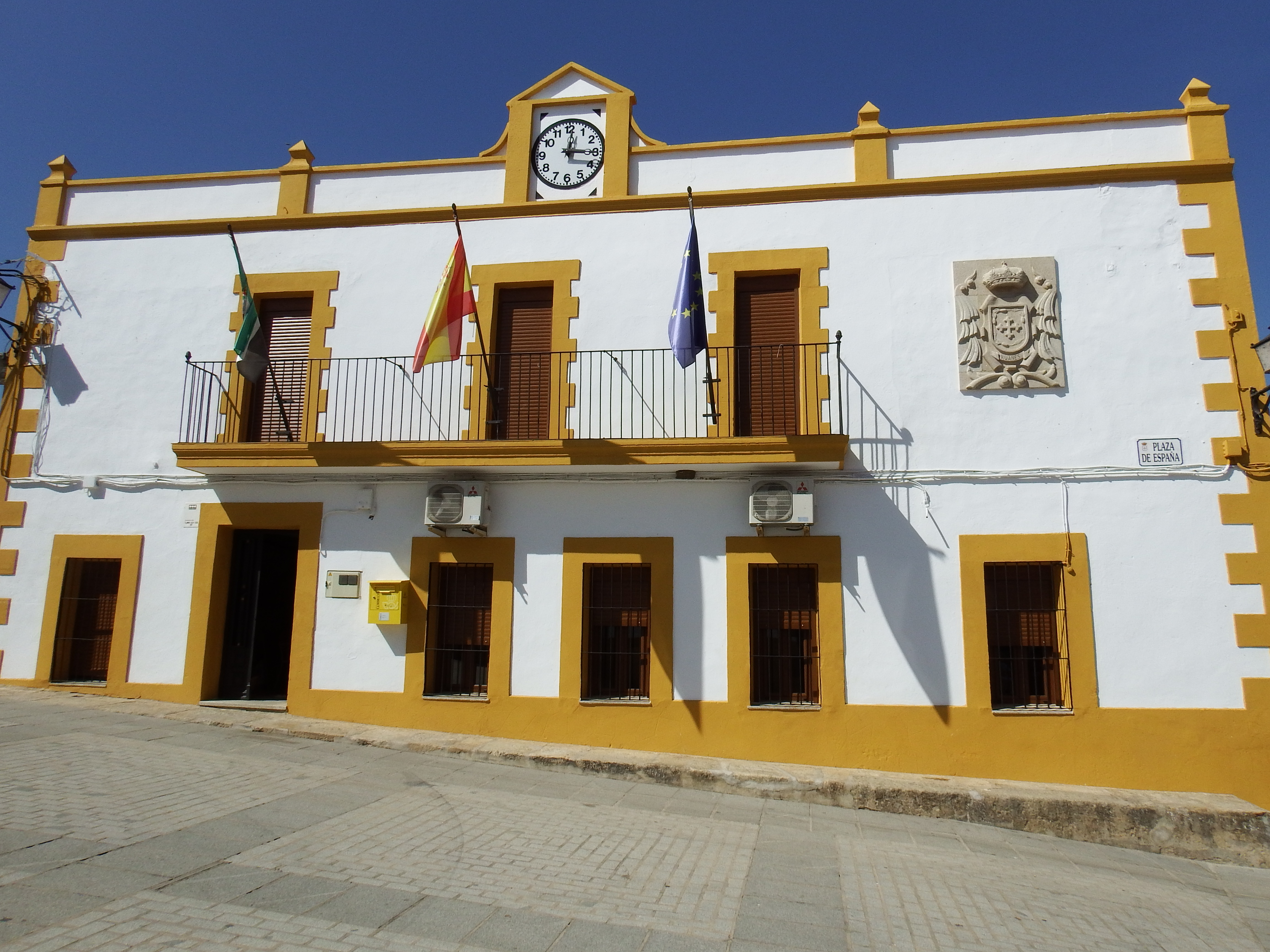
Ruanes Town Hall

== See also ==
- List of municipalities in Cáceres
