= Plasenzuela =

Coordinates: 39°23′N 6°03′W

Plasenzuela, Spain
- municipality
- Flag Coat of arms
- Interactive map of Plasenzuela, Spain
- Country: Spain
- Autonomous community: Extremadura
- Province: Cáceres
- Municipality: Plasenzuela

Area
  - Total: 36 km^{2} (14 sq mi)

Population (2025-01-01)
  - Total: 536
  - Density: 15/km^{2} (39/sq mi)
- Time zone: UTC+1 (CET)
  - Summer (DST): UTC+2 (CEST)

Plasenzuela is a municipality located in the province of Cáceres, Extremadura, Spain. According to the 2006 census (INE), the municipality has a population of 612 inhabitants.

== Geography ==
It is located in the Trujillo Cacereña penillanura. Its landscape is characterized by large plains with granitic batoliths .

== History ==
Plasenzuela has in its contours abundant archaeological remains among which is Cerro de la Horca with materials from different eras (Neolithic, Chalcolithic, Bronze Age), the Romazal necropolis with remains from the end of the Iron Age, El Guijo and some mines with the presence of Roman elements. Among them is an inscription three that includes the name Lucio Julio Ibarra, which is the oldest record of this surname, and casts some doubts on the time of the formation of the article in Basque. The Romans called the town Vetonesto after the inhabitants of the area. After the Islamic occupation period, it belonged to the municipality of Trujillo until in the 16th century. Juan de Vargas y Camargo bought the lands to become a manor. In the seventeenth century, the town passes to the noble family of Tapia and in the eighteenth century it became part of the Count of Canilleros lands.

In 1594 it was part of the municipality of Trujillo and also of the Province of Trujillo.

When the Old Regime fell, the town became a constitutional municipality of the region of Extremadura, and since 1834, it was integrated into the Judicial district of Trujillo. In the 1842, the census recorded to have 95 homes and 520 inhabitants.

== Monuments ==
The Catholic parish church is named in honor of the Assumption of Our Lady (Iglesia de la Asunción de Nuestra Señora), in the Archdiocese of Mérida-Badajoz, Diocese of Plasencia, Archpriesthood de Trujillo. The Church was constructed during the XV to XVII centuries and has a rectangular nave, with the main chapel directly facing to the east.

The Humilladero cross consists of a quadrangular four-step base, a shaft about four meters high, an Ionic capital and the cross. On its obverse there is the image of the crucified Christ and on the reverse that of the Virgin Mary. It is located within a small walled enclosure located on the ring road. 15

The source of the lions, located around the parish church, is also a reference in the municipality. In 2017 it has been repaired and put into operation.

== See also ==
- List of municipalities in Cáceres
