= Valdelacasa de Tajo =

Coordinates: 39°43′N 5°17′W

- municipality
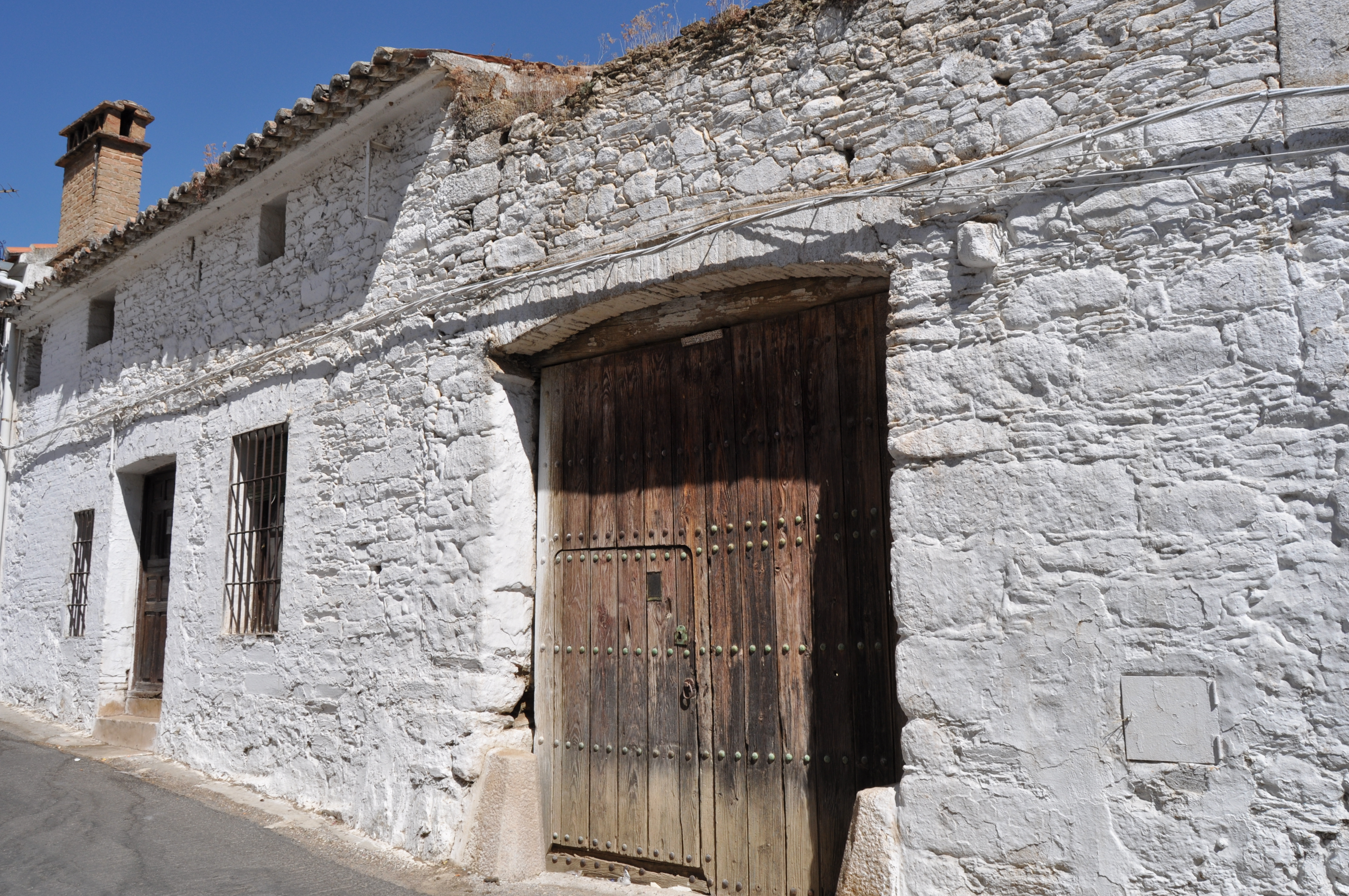
- view of Valdelacasa del Tajo

- Flag Coat of arms
- Interactive map of Valdelacasa de Tajo
- Country: Spain
- Autonomous community: Extremadura
- Province: Cáceres
- Municipality: Valdelacasa de Tajo

Area
  - Total: 72 km^{2} (28 sq mi)

Population (2025-01-01)
  - Total: 338
  - Density: 4.7/km^{2} (12/sq mi)
- Time zone: UTC+1 (CET)
  - Summer (DST): UTC+2 (CEST)

Valdelacasa de Tajo is a municipality located in the province of Cáceres, Extremadura, Spain. According to the 2006 census (INE), the municipality has a population of 477 inhabitants.

== See also ==
- List of municipalities in Cáceres
