= Peraleda de San Román =

- Municipality
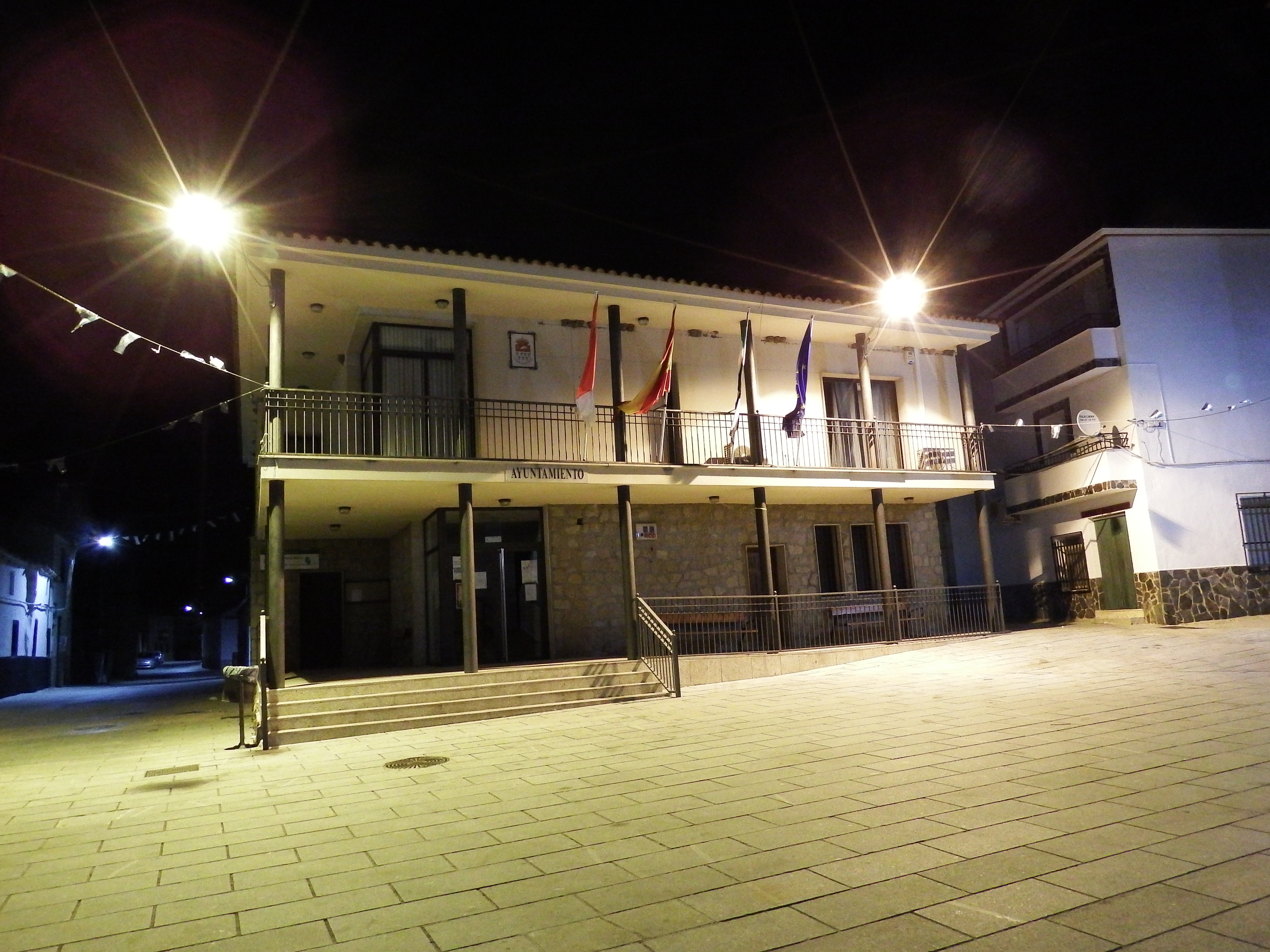
- Town hall

- Flag Coat of arms

- Location in Spain
- Coordinates: 39°51′N 5°28′W
- Country: Spain
- Autonomous community: Extremadura
- Province: Cáceres
- Municipality: Peraleda de San Román

Area
  - Total: 62 km^{2} (24 sq mi)
- Elevation: 470 m (1,540 ft)

Population (2025-01-01)
  - Total: 268
  - Density: 4.3/km^{2} (11/sq mi)
- Time zone: UTC+1 (CET)
  - Summer (DST): UTC+2 (CEST)

Peraleda de San Román is a municipality located in the province of Cáceres, Extremadura, Spain. According to the 2014 census, the municipality has a population of 316 inhabitants.

== See also ==
- List of municipalities in Cáceres
