= Carcaboso =

Coordinates: 40°03′N 6°13′W

Carcaboso, Spain
- municipality
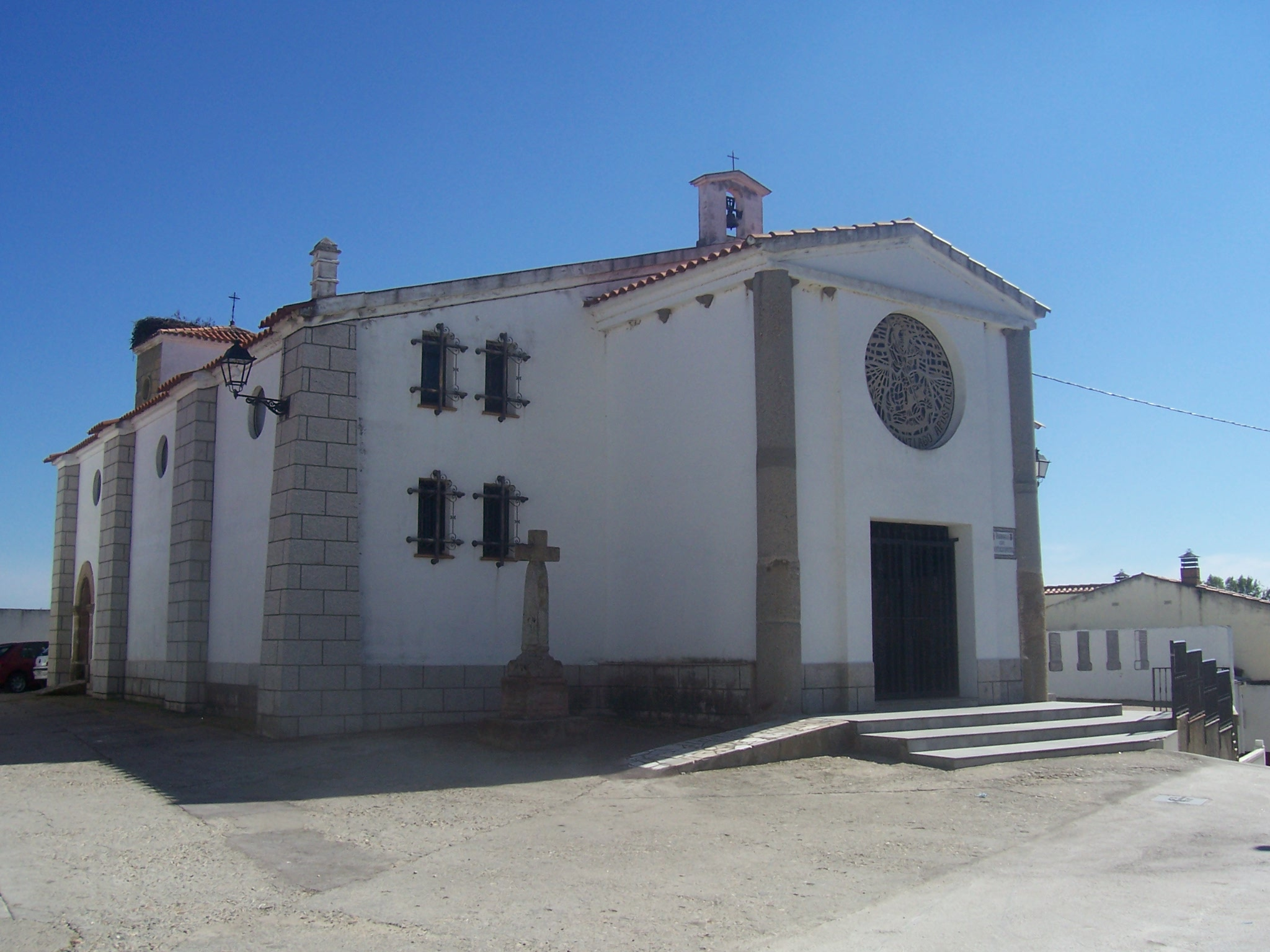
- Parish Church of Santiago Apóstol, in Carcaboso, Cáceres, Spain (2007)

- Flag Coat of arms
- Interactive map of Carcaboso, Spain
- Country: Spain
- Autonomous community: Extremadura
- Province: Cáceres
- Municipality: Carcaboso

Area
  - Total: 20.3 km^{2} (7.8 sq mi)

Population (2025-01-01)
  - Total: 1,076
  - Density: 53.0/km^{2} (137/sq mi)
- Time zone: UTC+1 (CET)
  - Summer (DST): UTC+2 (CEST)

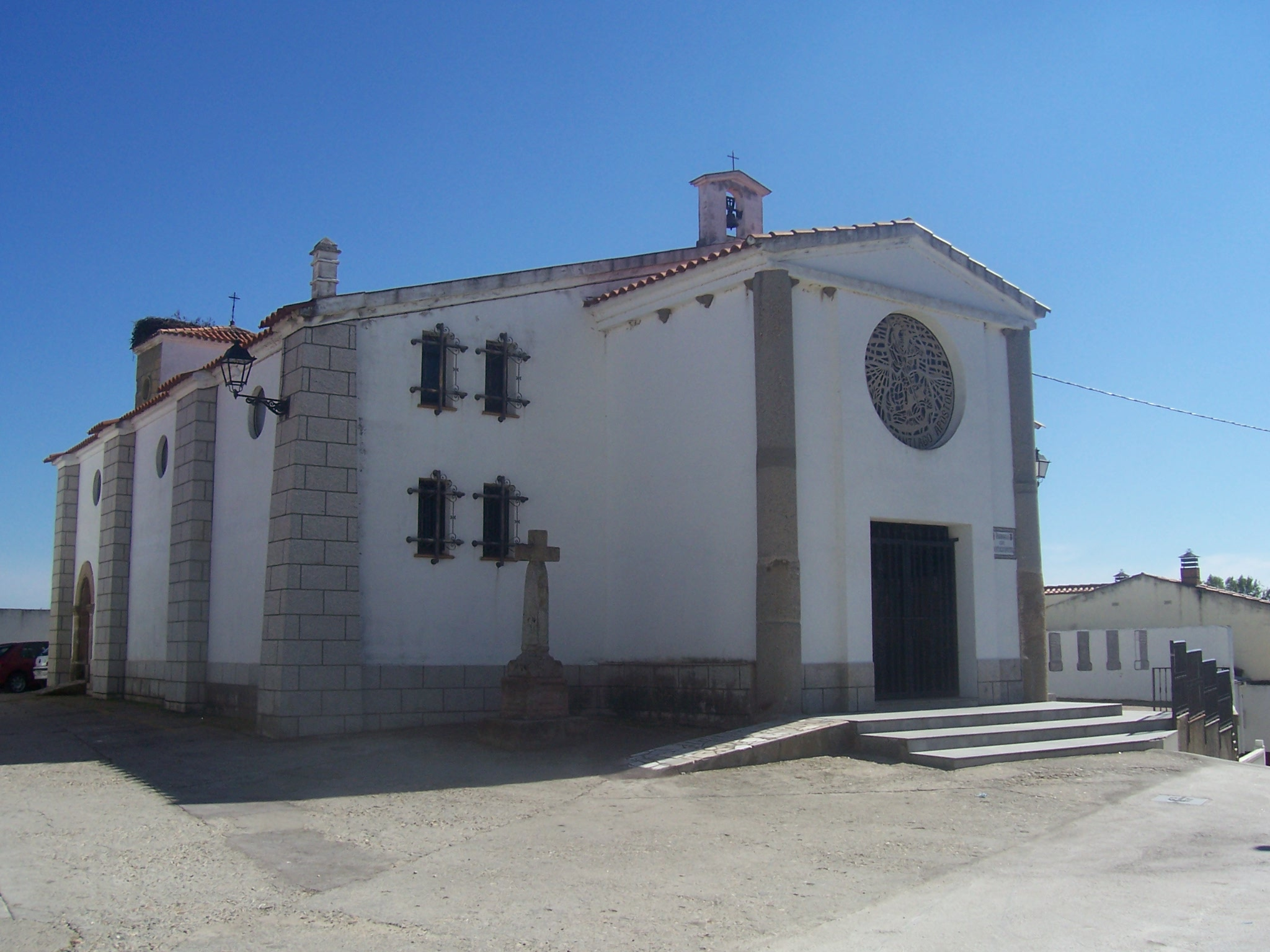
Parish Church of Santiago Apóstol, in Carcaboso, Cáceres, Spain (2007)

Carcaboso is a municipality located in the province of Cáceres, Extremadura, Spain. According to the 2012 census (INE), the municipality has a population of 1,137 inhabitants.

== See also ==
- List of municipalities in Cáceres
