= Holguera =

Coordinates: 39°54′N 6°21′W

Holguera, Spain
- municipality
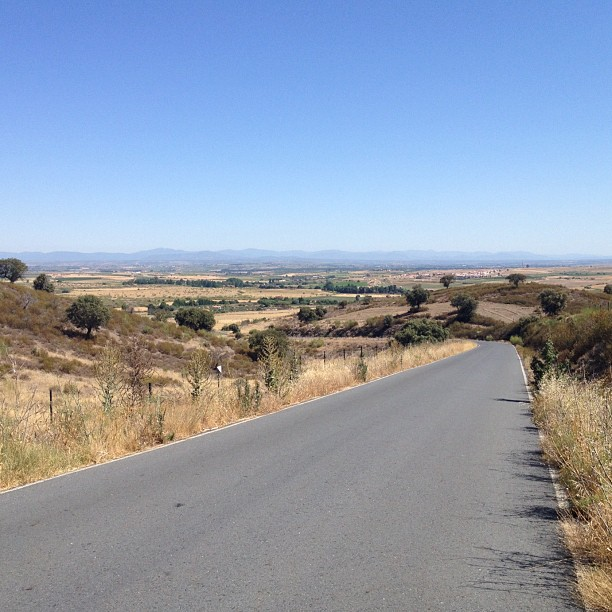

- Coat of arms
- Interactive map of Holguera, Spain
- Country: Spain
- Autonomous community: Extremadura
- Province: Cáceres
- Municipality: Holguera

Area
  - Total: 37 km^{2} (14 sq mi)

Population (2025-01-01)
  - Total: 588
  - Density: 16/km^{2} (41/sq mi)
- Time zone: UTC+1 (CET)
  - Summer (DST): UTC+2 (CEST)

Holguera is a municipality located in the province of Cáceres, Extremadura, Spain. According to the 2006 census (INE), the municipality has a population of 748 inhabitants.

== See also ==
- List of municipalities in Cáceres
