= Villa del Rey =

Coordinates: 39°39′N 6°49′W

Villa del Rey, Spain
- municipality
- Flag Coat of arms
- Interactive map of Villa del Rey, Spain
- Country: Spain
- Autonomous community: Extremadura
- Province: Cáceres
- Municipality: Villa del Rey

Area
  - Total: 57 km^{2} (22 sq mi)

Population (2025-01-01)
  - Total: 118
  - Density: 2.1/km^{2} (5.4/sq mi)
- Time zone: UTC+1 (CET)
  - Summer (DST): UTC+2 (CEST)

Villa del Rey is a municipality located in the province of Cáceres, Extremadura, Spain. According to the 2006 census (INE), the municipality has a population of 137 inhabitants.

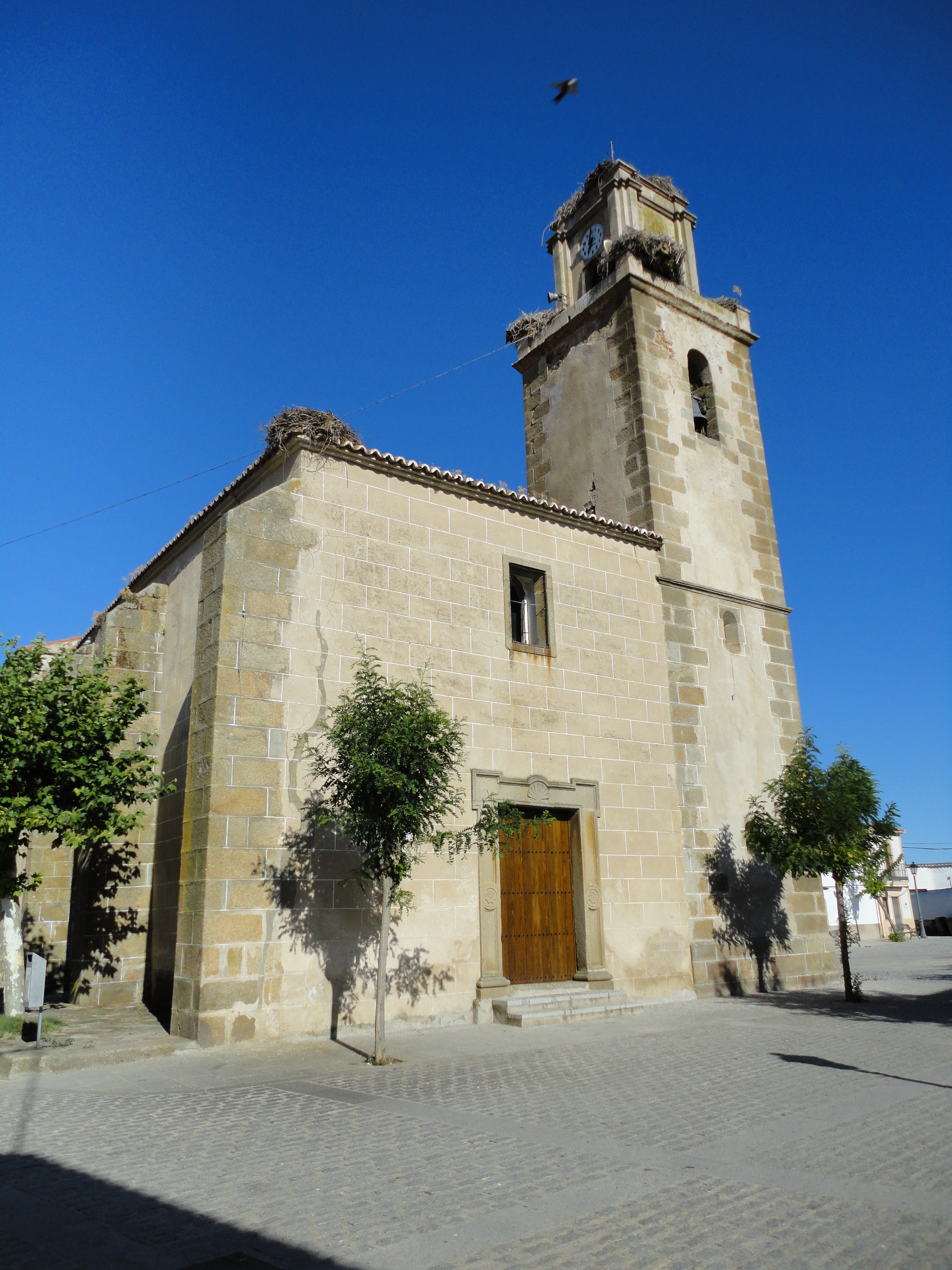
The Parish church of Villa del Rey, Cáceres province, Spain

== See also ==
- List of municipalities in Cáceres
