= Casillas de Coria =

Casillas de Coria, Spain
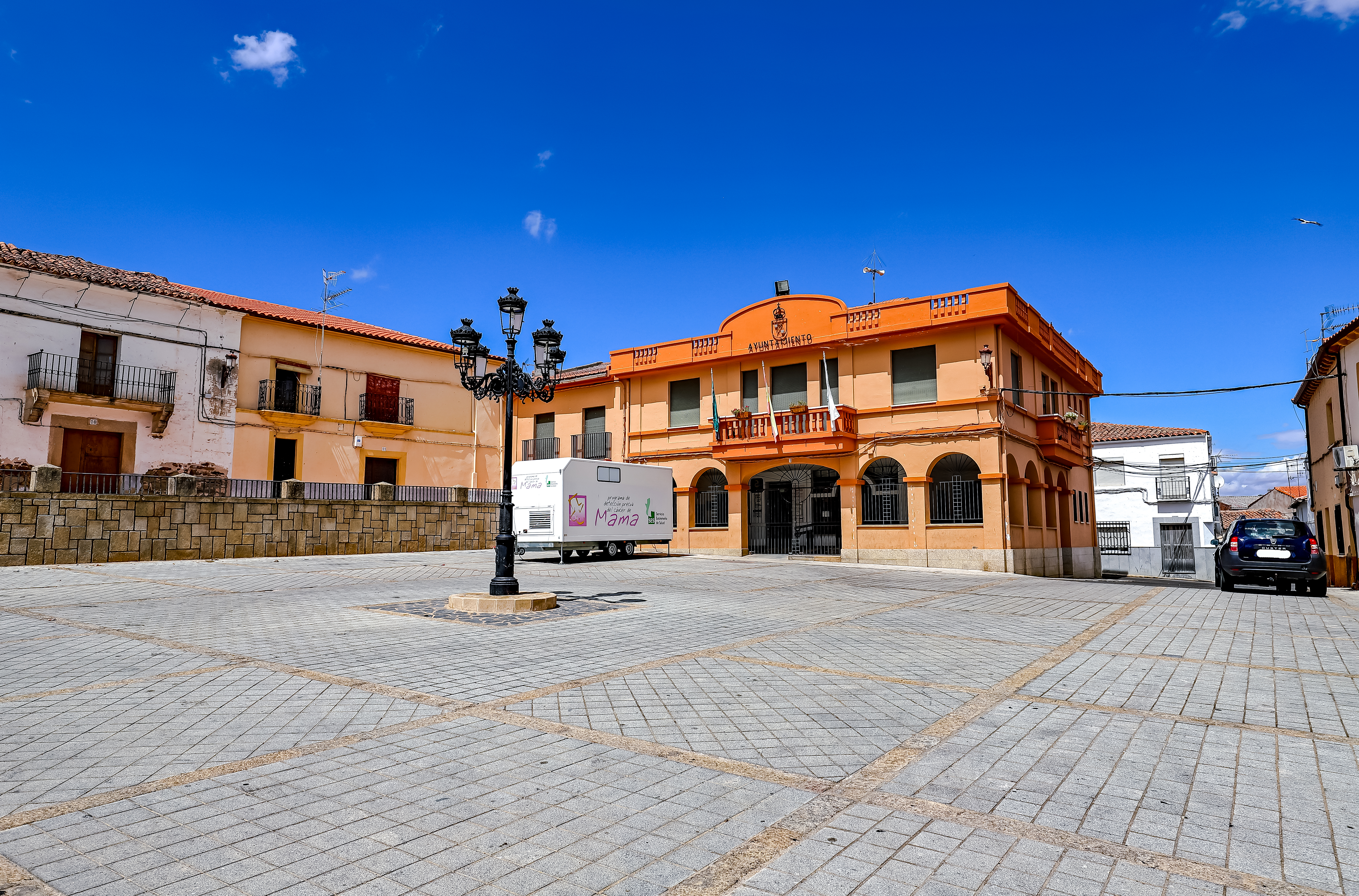
- The Town hall square

- Coat of arms
- Interactive map of Casillas de Coria, Spain
- Coordinates: 39°58′N 6°38′W
- Country: Spain
- Autonomous community: Extremadura
- Province: Cáceres
- Municipality: Casillas de Coria

Area
  - Total: 61 km^{2} (24 sq mi)
- Elevation: 245 m (804 ft)

Population (2025-01-01)
  - Total: 354
  - Density: 5.8/km^{2} (15/sq mi)
- Time zone: UTC+1 (CET)
  - Summer (DST): UTC+2 (CEST)

Casillas de Coria is a municipality located in the province of Cáceres, Extremadura, Spain. According to the 2005 census (INE), the municipality has a population of 484 inhabitants.

== See also ==
- List of municipalities in Cáceres
