= Huélaga =

Huélaga, Spain
- municipality
- Flag Coat of arms
- Interactive map of Huélaga, Spain
- Coordinates: 40°03′N 6°37′W
- Country: Spain
- Autonomous community: Extremadura
- Province: Cáceres
- Municipality: Huélaga

Area
  - Total: 11 km^{2} (4.2 sq mi)
- Elevation: 286 m (938 ft)

Population (2025-01-01)
  - Total: 203
  - Density: 18/km^{2} (48/sq mi)
- Time zone: UTC+1 (CET)
  - Summer (DST): UTC+2 (CEST)

Huélaga is a municipality located in the province of Cáceres, Extremadura, Spain. According to the 2005 census (INE), the municipality has a population of 191 inhabitants.

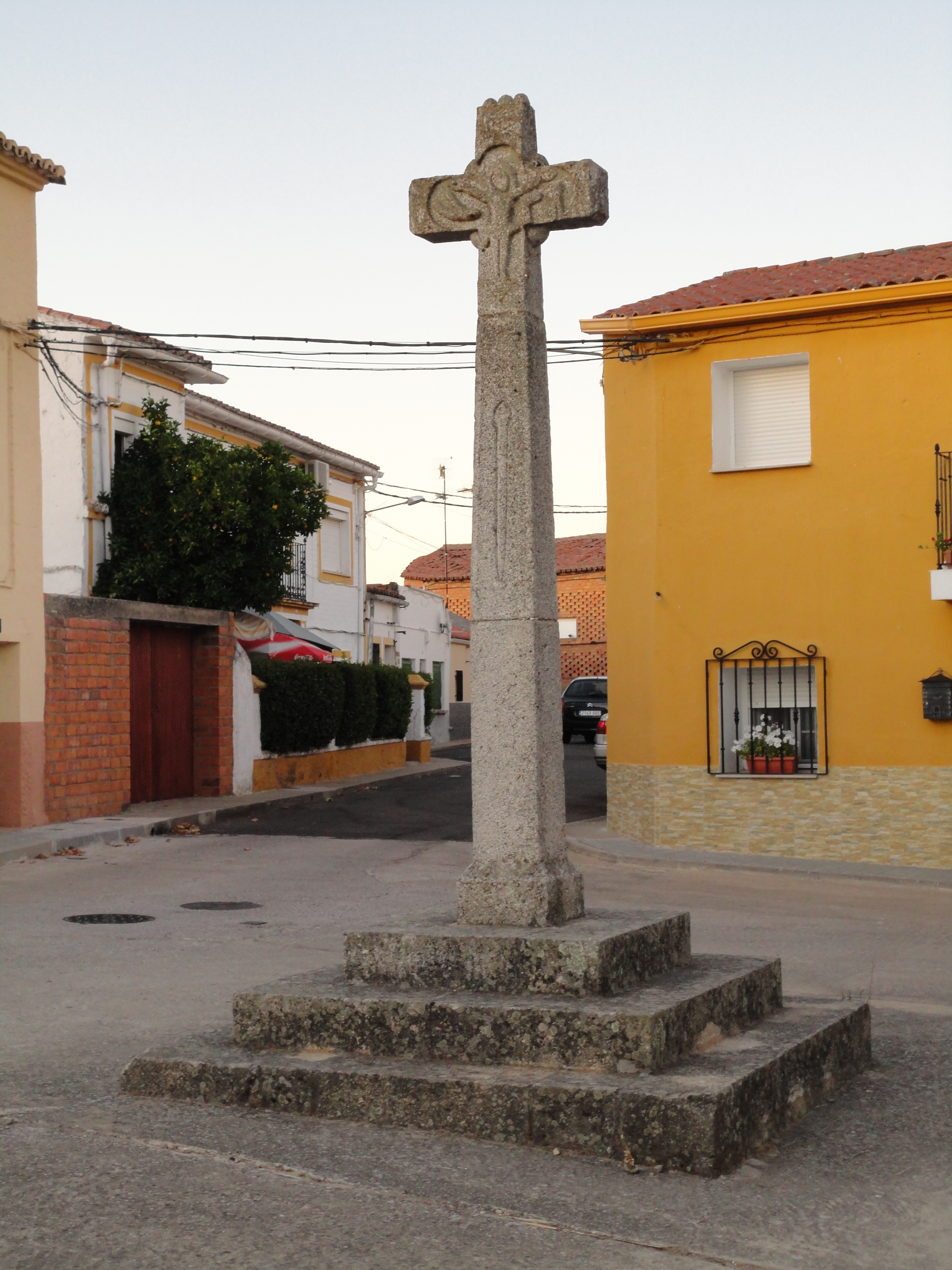
Cross in the street of Huélaga, Cáceres province, Spain

== See also ==
- List of municipalities in Cáceres
