= Acehúche =

Coordinates: 39°48′0″N 6°38′0″W

Acehúche, Spain
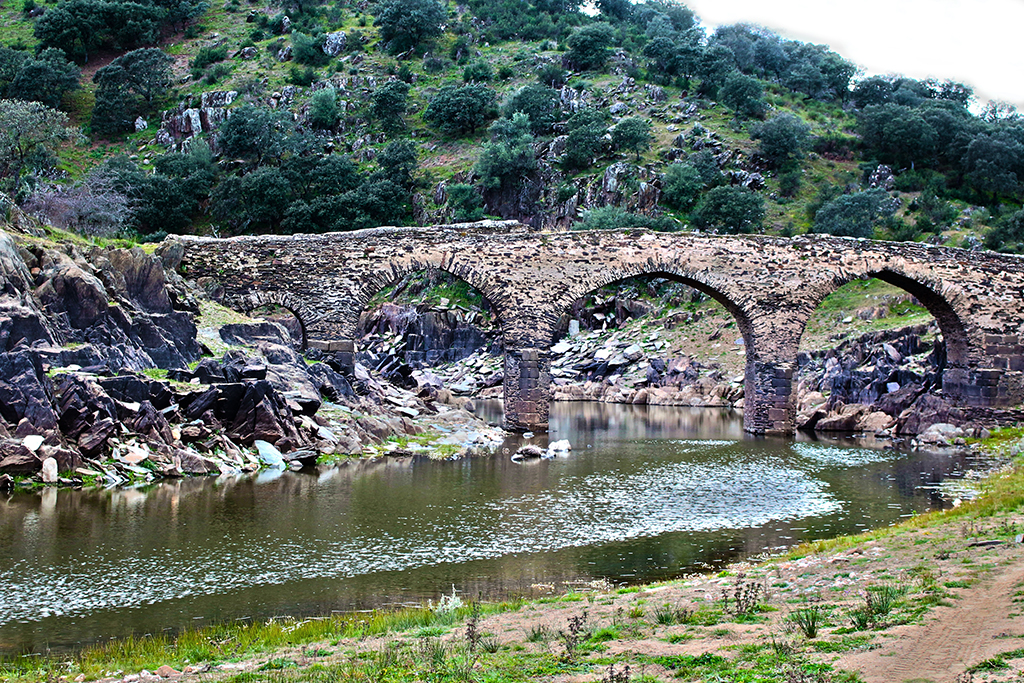
- Fresnedosa River in Acehuche

- Coat of arms

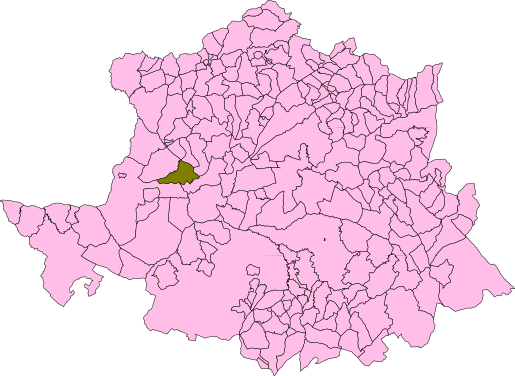
- Map of Acehuche
- Country: Spain
- Autonomous community: Extremadura
- Province: Cáceres
- Municipality: Acehúche

Area
  - Total: 91 km^{2} (35 sq mi)

Population (2025-01-01)
  - Total: 808
  - Density: 8.9/km^{2} (23/sq mi)
- Time zone: UTC+1 (CET)
  - Summer (DST): UTC+2 (CEST)

Acehúche is a municipality located in the province of Cáceres, Extremadura, Spain. According to the 2006 census (INE), the municipality has a population of 866 inhabitants.

== See also ==
- List of municipalities in Cáceres
