= Hernán-Pérez =

Municipality located in the province of Cáceres

Coordinates: 40°13′N 6°28′W

Hernán-Pérez, Spain
- municipality
- Coat of arms
- Interactive map of Hernán-Pérez, Spain
- Country: Spain
- Autonomous community: Extremadura
- Province: Cáceres
- Municipality: Hernán-Pérez

Government
  - Mayor: Pablo Iglesias Ordoñez

Area
  - Total: 35 km^{2} (14 sq mi)
- Elevation: 439 m (1,440 ft)

Population (2025-01-01)
  - Total: 401
  - Density: 11/km^{2} (30/sq mi)
- Time zone: UTC+1 (CET)
  - Summer (DST): UTC+2 (CEST)

Hernán-Pérez (Spanish pronunciation: [eɾˈnam ˈpeɾeθ]) is a municipality located in the province of Cáceres, Extremadura, Spain.

== 2011 population ==
According to the 2011 census (INE), the municipality has a population of 510 inhabitants.

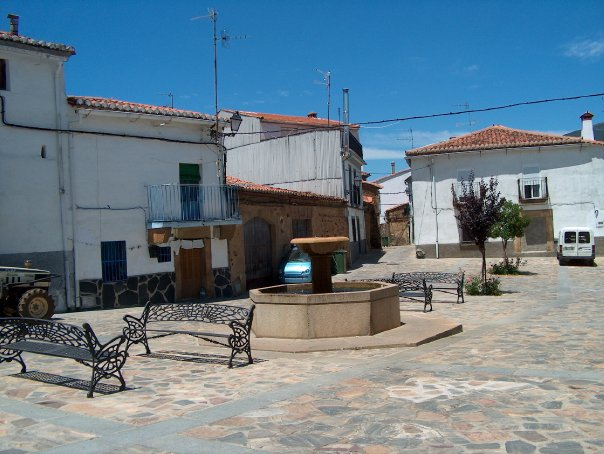
Main Square of Hernán-Pérez

== See also ==
- List of municipalities in Cáceres
