= La Garganta =

La Garganta, Spain
- municipality
- Coat of arms
- Interactive map of La Garganta, Spain
- Coordinates: 40.3167°N 5.8167°W
- Country: Spain
- Autonomous community: Extremadura
- Province: Cáceres
- Municipality: La Garganta

Area
  - Total: 24 km^{2} (9.3 sq mi)

Population (2025-01-01)
  - Total: 353
  - Density: 15/km^{2} (38/sq mi)
- Time zone: UTC+1 (CET)
  - Summer (DST): UTC+2 (CEST)

La Garganta is a municipality located in the province of Cáceres, Extremadura, Spain. According to the 2006 census (INE), the municipality has a population of 530 inhabitants.

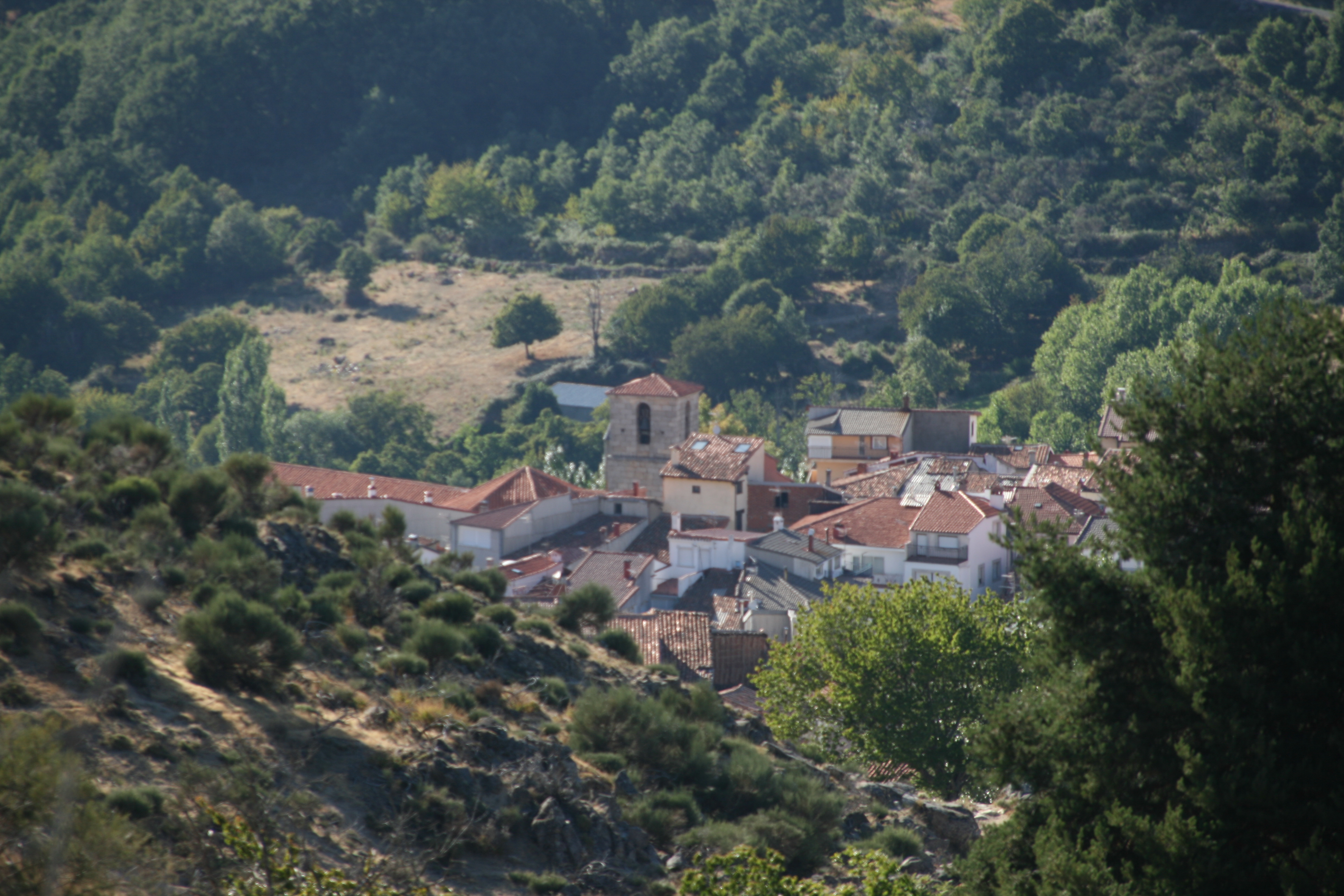
View of La Garganta from Candelario road

== See also ==
- List of municipalities in Cáceres
