= Rosalejo =

Coordinates: 39°26′N 4°54′W

Rosalejo, Spain
- municipality
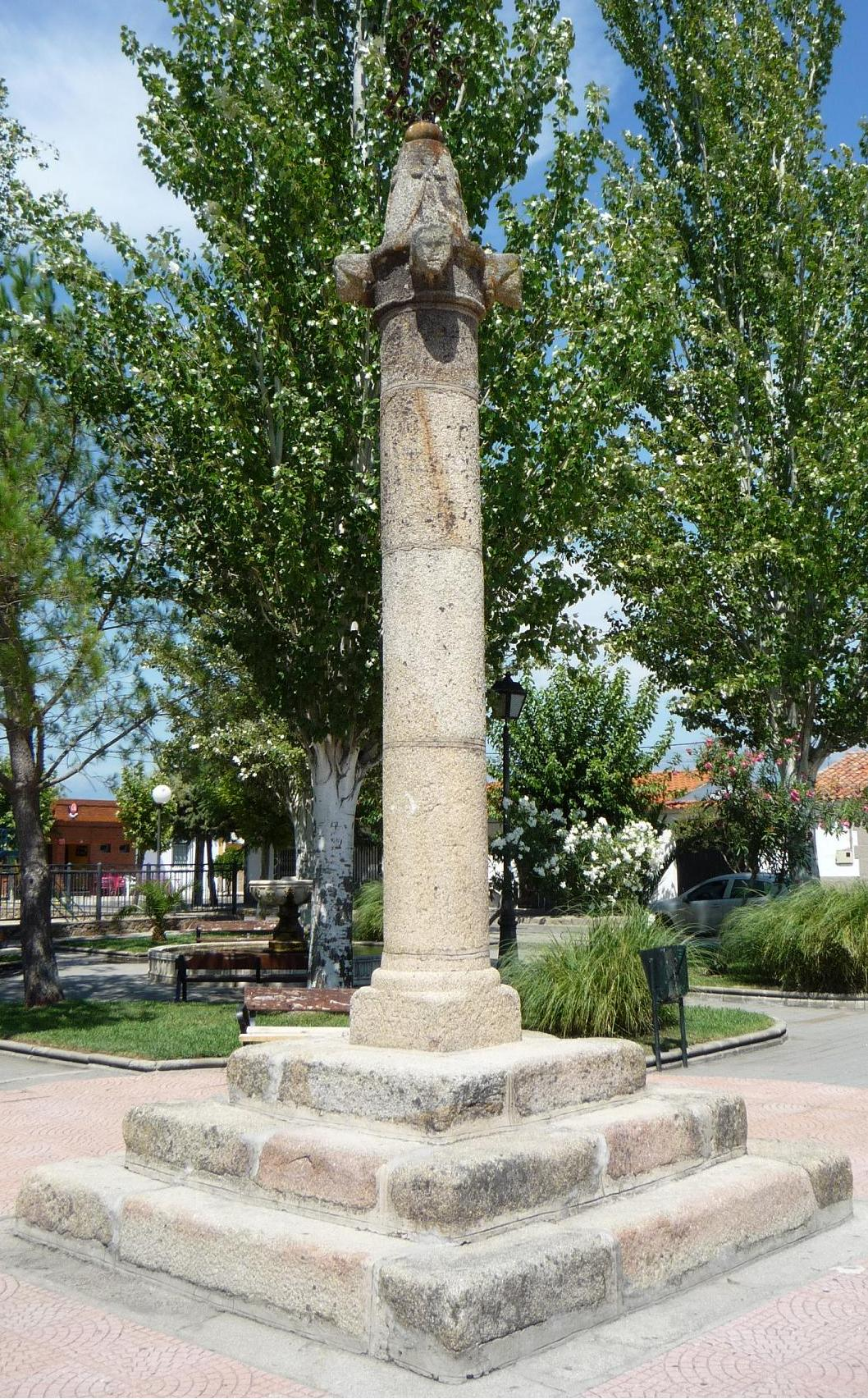

- Flag Coat of arms
- Interactive map of Rosalejo, Spain
- Country: Spain
- Autonomous community: Extremadura
- Province: Cáceres
- Municipality: Rosalejo

Area
  - Total: 41 km^{2} (16 sq mi)

Population (2025-01-01)
  - Total: 1,268
  - Density: 31/km^{2} (80/sq mi)
- Time zone: UTC+1 (CET)
  - Summer (DST): UTC+2 (CEST)

Rosalejo is a municipality located in the province of Cáceres, Extremadura, Spain. According to the 2006 census (INE), the municipality has a population of 1454 inhabitants.

== See also ==
- List of municipalities in Cáceres
