= Casas de Don Gómez =

- municipality
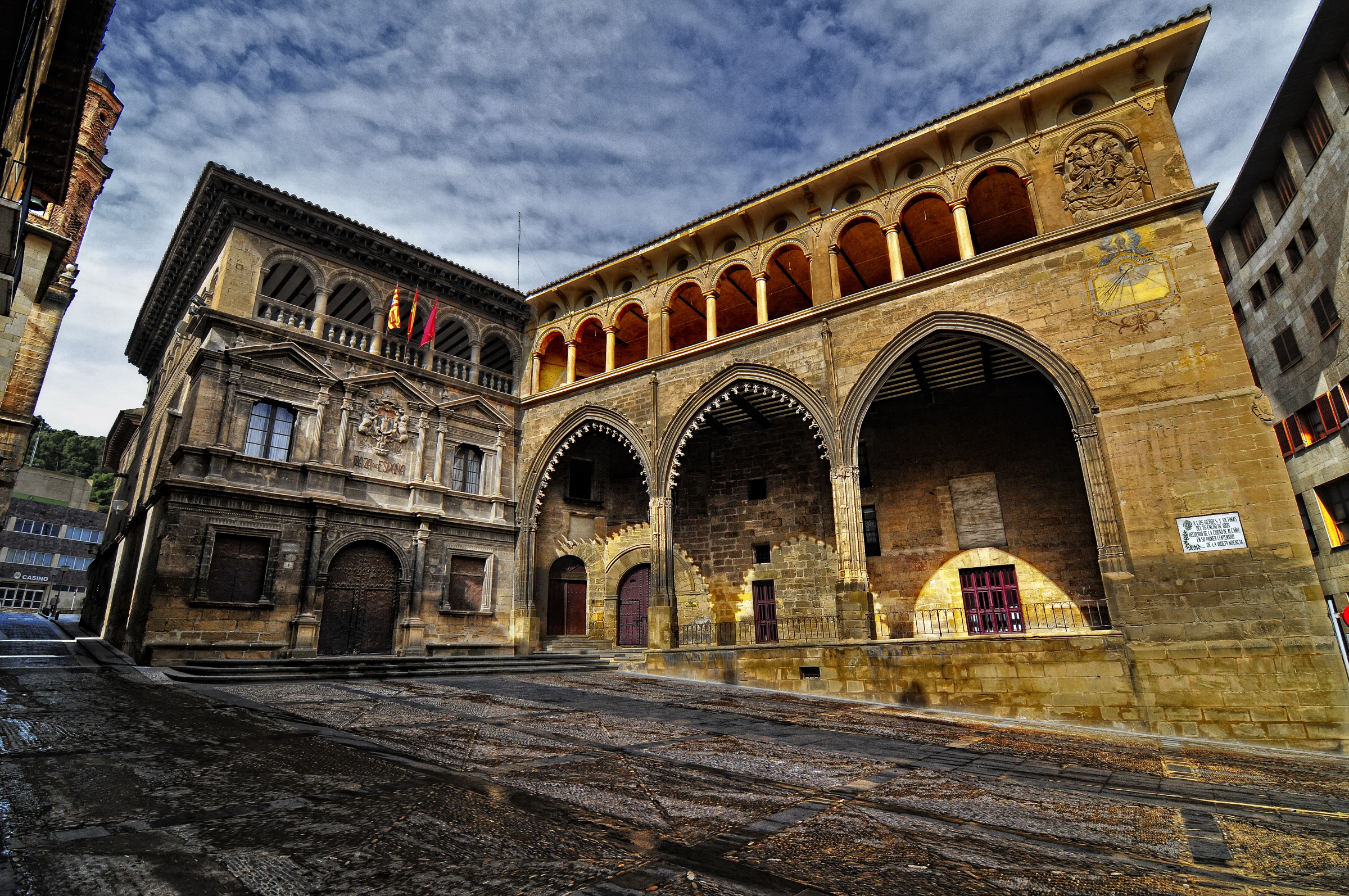
- Town hall

- Flag Coat of arms

- Location in Spain.
- Coordinates: 40°01′N 6°36′W
- Country: Spain
- Autonomous community: Extremadura
- Province: Cáceres
- Comarca: Vegas del Alagón

Government
  - Mayor: Carlos Barrantes Clemente

Area
  - Total: 31.16 km^{2} (12.03 sq mi)

Population (2025-01-01)
  - Total: 342
  - Density: 11.0/km^{2} (28.4/sq mi)
- Time zone: UTC+1 (CET)
  - Summer (DST): UTC+2 (CEST)

Casas de Don Gómez (Spanish pronunciation: [ˈkasas ðe ðoŋ ˈɡomeθ]) is a municipality located in the province of Cáceres, Extremadura, Spain.

== See also ==
- List of municipalities in Cáceres
