= Torremenga =

Coordinates: 40°03′N 5°46′W

- Flag Coat of arms

- Location in Spain.
- Country: Spain
- Autonomous community: Cáceres

Area
  - Total: 12 km^{2} (4.6 sq mi)
- Elevation: 524 m (1,719 ft)

Population (2025-01-01)
  - Total: 620
  - Density: 52/km^{2} (130/sq mi)
- Time zone: UTC+1 (CET)
  - Summer (DST): UTC+2 (CEST)
- Website: www.torremenga.es

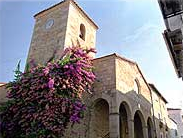
The Torremenga Church

Torremenga is a municipality located in the province of Cáceres, in the autonomous community of Extremadura, Spain. It had a population of 603 inhabitants in 12 km. There are some Roman and Prehistoric remains and some typical porches with granite pillars. There is a Visigothic castle and a 17th-century church.

== See also ==
- List of municipalities in Cáceres
