= Santibáñez el Alto =

Coordinates: 40°11′N 6°33′W

Santibáñez el Alto, Spain
- municipality
- Coat of arms
- Interactive map of Santibáñez el Alto, Spain
- Country: Spain
- Autonomous community: Extremadura
- Province: Cáceres
- Municipality: Santibáñez el Alto

Area
  - Total: 99 km^{2} (38 sq mi)

Population (2025-01-01)
  - Total: 386
  - Density: 3.9/km^{2} (10/sq mi)
- Time zone: UTC+1 (CET)
  - Summer (DST): UTC+2 (CEST)

Santibáñez el Alto (Spanish pronunciation: [san.tiˈβa.ɲeθ el ˈal.to]) is a municipality located in the province of Cáceres, Extremadura, Spain. According to the 2006 census (INE), the municipality has a population of 480 inhabitants.

== See also ==
- List of municipalities in Cáceres
