= Torrejoncillo =

Coordinates: 39°54′N 6°28′W

Torrejoncillo, Spain
- municipality
- Flag Coat of arms

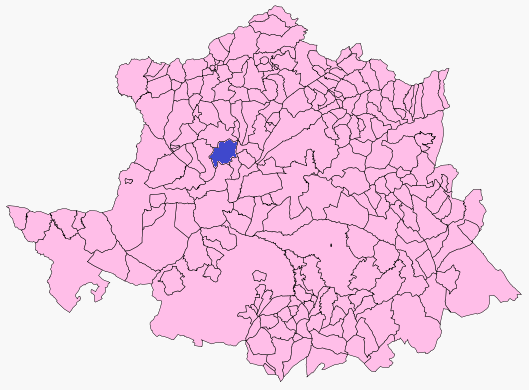
- Country: Spain
- Autonomous community: Extremadura
- Province: Cáceres
- Municipality: Torrejoncillo

Area
  - Total: 94 km^{2} (36 sq mi)
- Elevation: 328 m (1,076 ft)

Population (2025-01-01)
  - Total: 2,743
  - Density: 29/km^{2} (76/sq mi)
- Time zone: UTC+1 (CET)
  - Summer (DST): UTC+2 (CEST)

Torrejoncillo (Spanish: [to.re.xonˈθiʎo]; Extremaduran: Torrojoncillu) is a municipality located in the province of Cáceres, Extremadura, Spain. According to the 2006 census (INE), the municipality has a population of 3350 inhabitants.

== See also ==
- List of municipalities in Cáceres
