= Aldea del Cano =

Coordinates: 39°17′N 6°19′W

Aldea del Cano, Spain
- municipality
- Flag Coat of arms
- Interactive map of Aldea del Cano, Spain
- Country: Spain
- Autonomous community: Extremadura
- Province: Cáceres
- Municipality: Aldea del Cano

Area
  - Total: 28 km^{2} (11 sq mi)
- Elevation: 390 m (1,280 ft)

Population (2025-01-01)
  - Total: 609
  - Density: 22/km^{2} (56/sq mi)
- Time zone: UTC+1 (CET)
  - Summer (DST): UTC+2 (CEST)

Aldea del Cano is a municipality located in the province of Cáceres, Extremadura, Spain. According to the 2006 census (INE), the municipality has a population of 751 inhabitants.

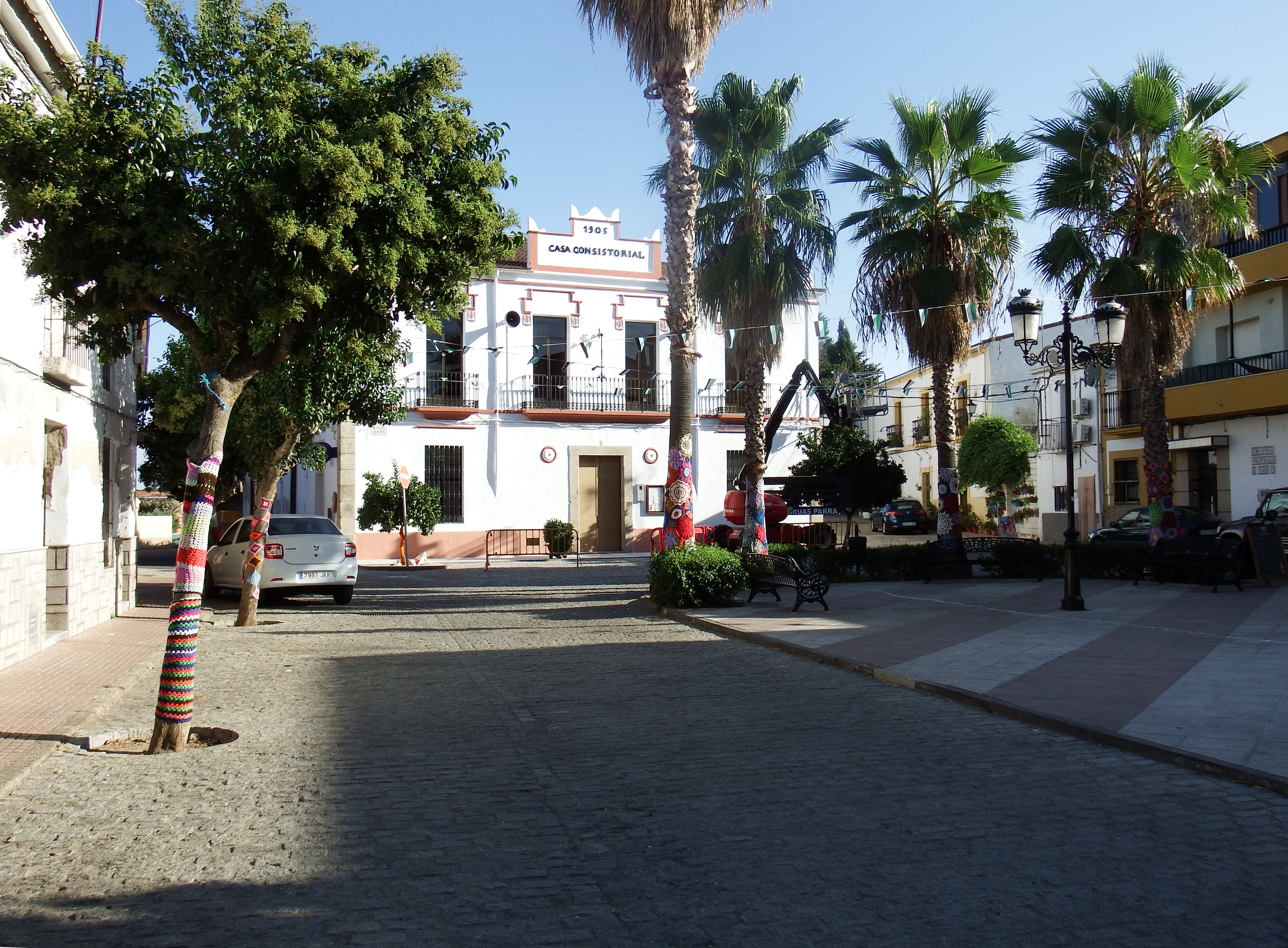
Aldea del Cano Town Hall Square

== See also ==
- List of municipalities in Cáceres
