= Abertura =

Coordinates: 39°15′N 5°49′W

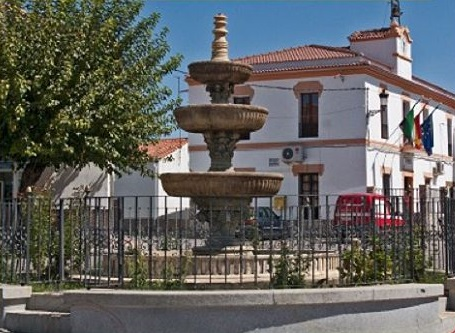
- Plaza de España Abertura

- Coat of arms

- Location in Spain.
- Country: Spain
- Autonomous community: Extremadura
- Province: Cáceres

Area
  - Total: 62.71 km^{2} (24.21 sq mi)
- Elevation: 314 m (1,030 ft)

Population (2025-01-01)
  - Total: 362
  - Density: 5.77/km^{2} (15.0/sq mi)
- Time zone: UTC+1 (CET)
  - Summer (DST): UTC+2 (CEST)
- Website: www.abertura.es

Abertura is a municipality in the province of Cáceres and autonomous community of Extremadura, Spain. The municipality covers an area of 62.71 square kilometres (24.21 sq mi) and as of 2011 it had a population of 447 people.

== Geography ==
The municipal district is generally flat, with an altitude of between 380 and 430m, taking the Esparragosa as the highest point. The main rivers are the Búrdalo and Alcollarín rivers.

== Demography ==
Abertura has had the following populations from 1900:

Historical population

Year	Pop.	±%
1900	1,124	—
1910	1,026	−8.7%
1920	1,245	+21.3%
1930	1,308	+5.1%
1940	1,304	−0.3%
1950	1,436	+10.1%

Year	Pop.	±%
1960	1,393	−3.0%
1970	871	−37.5%
1981	608	−30.2%
1991	532	−12.5%
2001	512	−3.8%
2002	509	−0.6%

Year	Pop.	±%
2003	501	−1.6%
2004	506	+1.0%
2005	505	−0.2%
2006	486	−3.8%
2010	459	−5.6%

== History ==
In 1594 Cáceres formed part of the land of Trujillo in Trujillo Province. At the fall of the Ancien Régime it was part of the constitutional municipality in the region of Extremadura that, from 1834, became part of the Judicial District of Logrosán. According to an 1842 census, the area accounted for 200 households and 1096 residents.

== Education ==
In 2001, Abertura was the third municipality of more than 100 inhabitants in Cáceres province with a majority of the population without an education. In total, 66.2% of the population greater than 10 years old lacked any type of educational training. This percentage was well above the 23.9% regional average and the 15.3% state average.

== Monuments ==
- San Juan Bautista Parish Church (15th century)
- Santa Ana Hermitage

== See also ==
- List of municipalities in Cáceres
