= Descargamaría =

Coordinates: 40°18′N 6°29′W

- Coat of arms

- Location in Spain.
- Country: Spain
- Autonomous community: Cáceres

Area
  - Total: 49.2 km^{2} (19.0 sq mi)
- Elevation: 481 m (1,578 ft)

Population (2025-01-01)
  - Total: 105
  - Density: 2.13/km^{2} (5.53/sq mi)
- Time zone: UTC+1 (CET)
  - Summer (DST): UTC+2 (CEST)
- Website: www.descargamaria.es

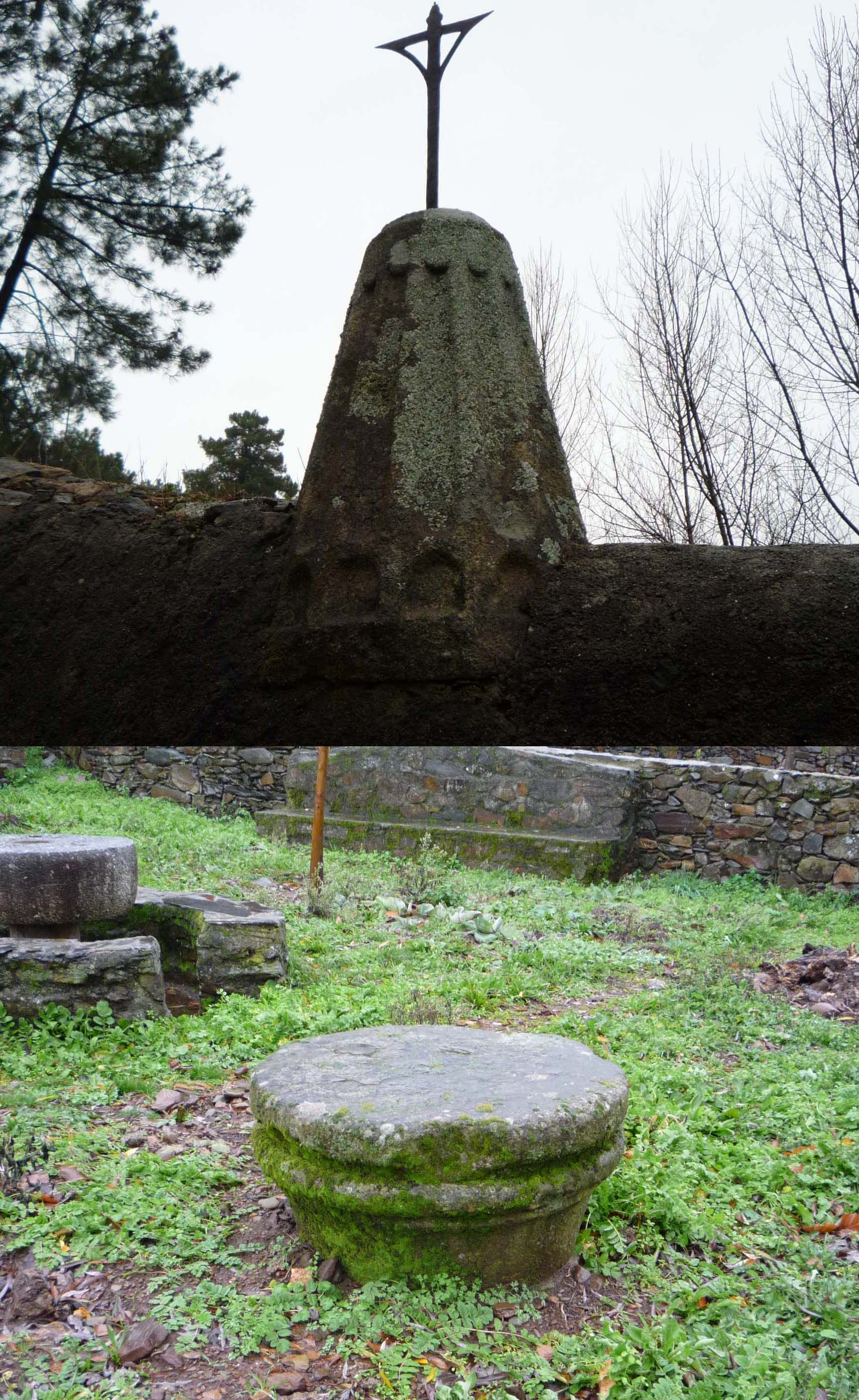
Descargamaría

Descargamaría is a municipality in the province of Cáceres and autonomous community of Extremadura, Spain. The municipality covers an area of 49.92 square kilometres (19.27 sq mi) and as of 2011 had a population of 190 people.

== See also ==
- List of municipalities in Cáceres
