= Torrequemada =

Torrequemada, Spain
- Coat of arms
- Interactive map of Torrequemada, Spain
- Coordinates: 39°22′N 6°13′W
- Country: Spain
- Autonomous community: Extremadura
- Province: Cáceres
- Municipality: Torrequemada

Area
  - Total: 30 km^{2} (12 sq mi)

Population (2025-01-01)
  - Total: 564
  - Density: 19/km^{2} (49/sq mi)
- Time zone: UTC+1 (CET)
  - Summer (DST): UTC+2 (CEST)

Torrequemada is a municipality located in the province of Cáceres, in the autonomous community of Extremadura, Spain. The name Torrequemada is derived from the Spanish words torre meaning "tower" and quemada meaning "burnt." In 1594 it was part of the Cáceres district in the province of Trujillo.

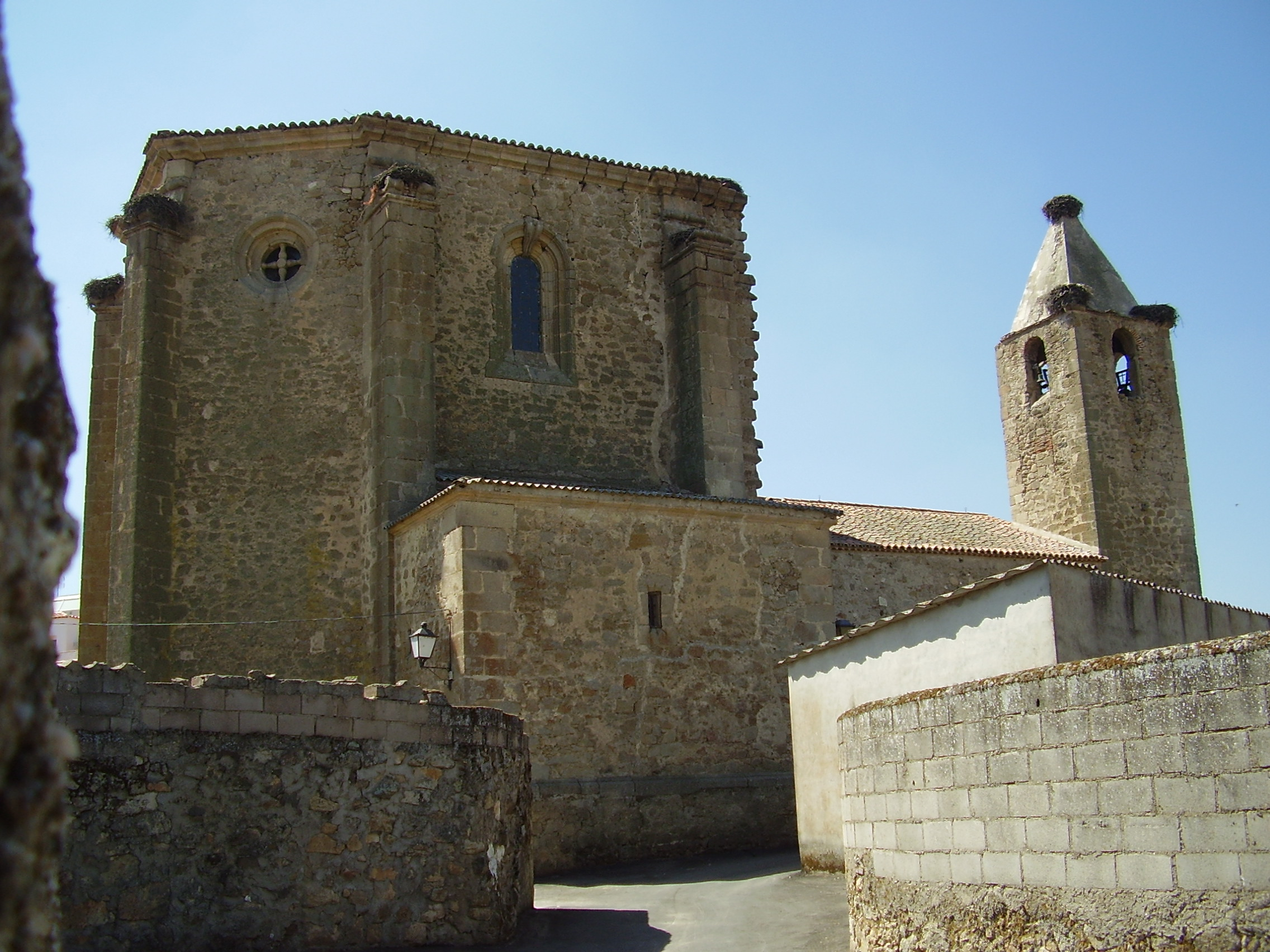
Church of Torrequemada

== See also ==
- List of municipalities in Cáceres
