= Hinojal =

Hinojal, Spain
- municipality
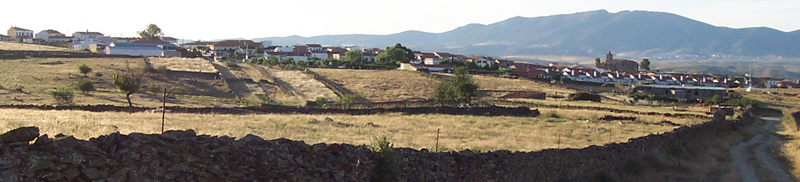
- Panoramic view of Hinojal

- Coat of arms
- Interactive map of Hinojal, Spain
- Coordinates: 39°42′N 6°21′W
- Country: Spain
- Autonomous community: Extremadura
- Province: Cáceres
- Municipality: Hinojal

Area
  - Total: 63 km^{2} (24 sq mi)
- Elevation: 338 m (1,109 ft)

Population (2025-01-01)
  - Total: 391
  - Density: 6.2/km^{2} (16/sq mi)
- Time zone: UTC+1 (CET)
  - Summer (DST): UTC+2 (CEST)

Hinojal is a municipality located in the province of Cáceres, Extremadura, Spain. According to the 2005 census (INE), the municipality has a population of 431 inhabitants.

== See also ==
- List of municipalities in Cáceres
