= Santa Marta de Magasca =

Coordinates: 39°31′N 6°06′W

Santa Marta de Magasca, Spain
- municipality
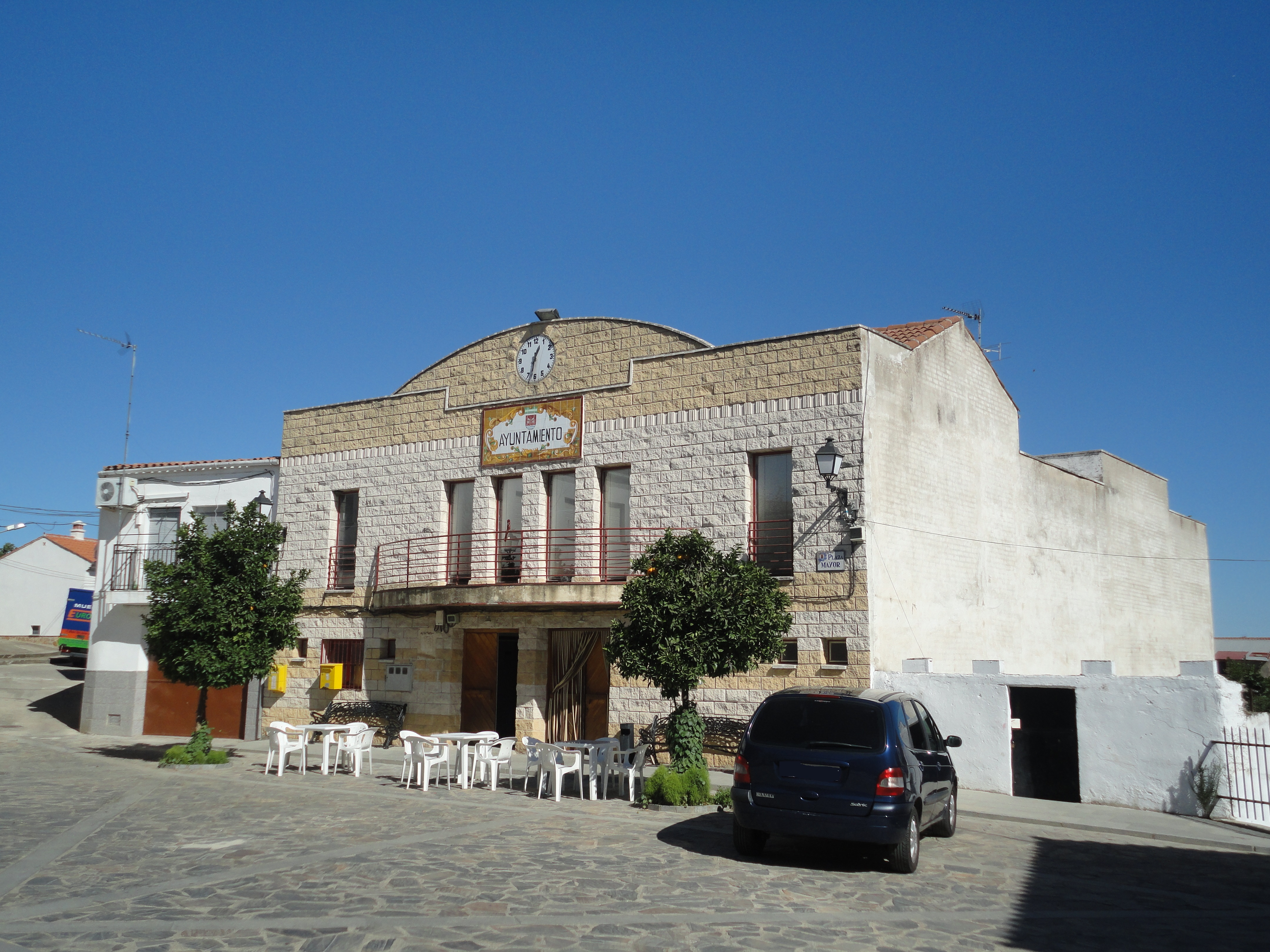
- Town hall of Santa Marta de Magasca, province of Cáceres, Spain.

- Flag Coat of arms
- Interactive map of Santa Marta de Magasca, Spain
- Country: Spain
- Autonomous community: Extremadura
- Province: Cáceres
- Municipality: Santa Marta de Magasca

Area
  - Total: 39 km^{2} (15 sq mi)

Population (2025-01-01)
  - Total: 291
  - Density: 7.5/km^{2} (19/sq mi)
- Time zone: UTC+1 (CET)
  - Summer (DST): UTC+2 (CEST)

Santa Marta de Magasca is a municipality located in the province of Cáceres, Extremadura, Spain. According to the 2006 census (INE), the municipality has a population of 252 inhabitants.

== See also ==
- List of municipalities in Cáceres
