= List of municipalities in Cáceres =

Map of Spain with the province of Cáceres highlighted

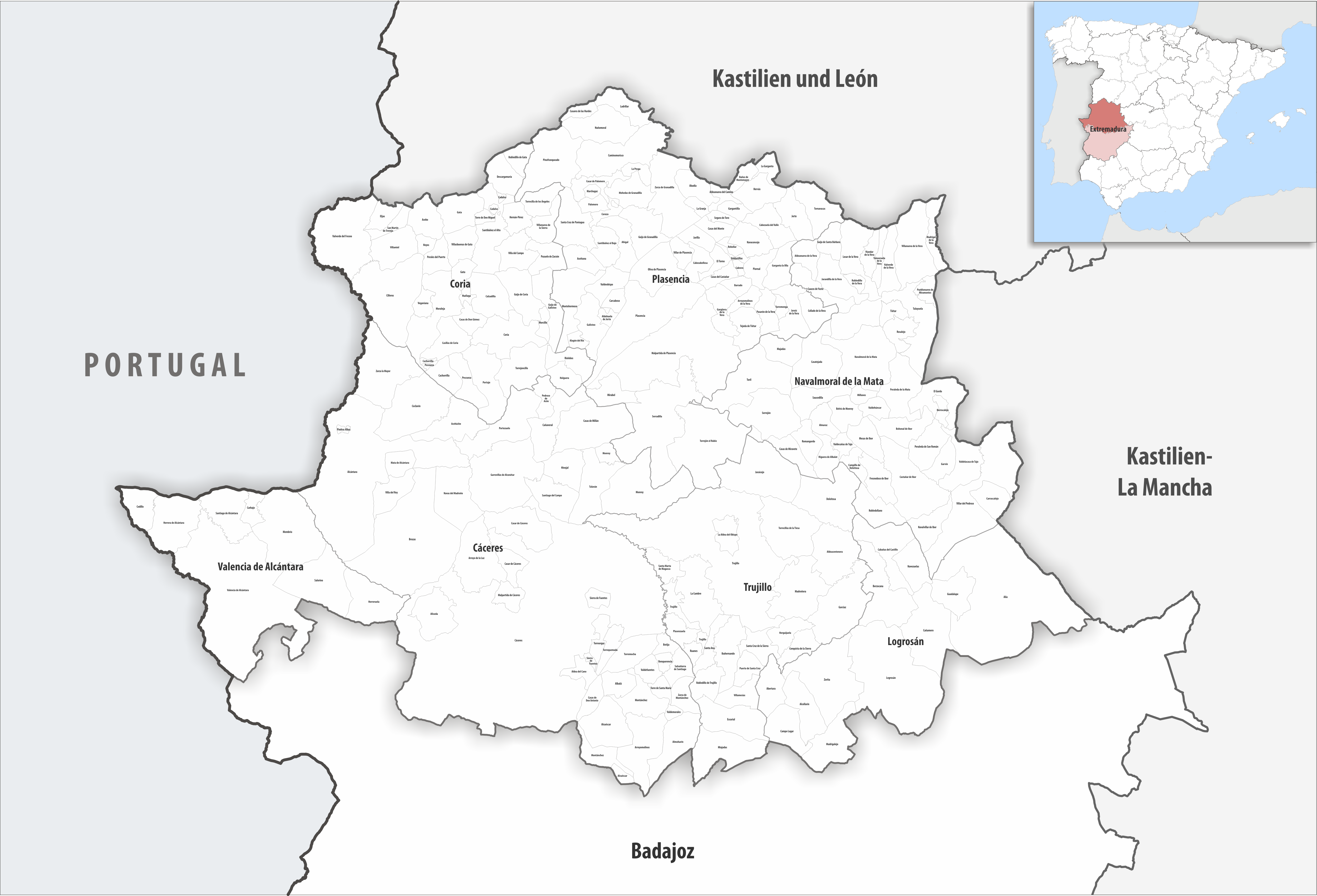
Map of the municipalities in the province of Cáceres

This is a list of the municipalities in the province of Cáceres in the autonomous community of Extremadura, Spain. There are 223 municipalities.

== Municipalities ==
Largest municipalities in the province of Albacete by population

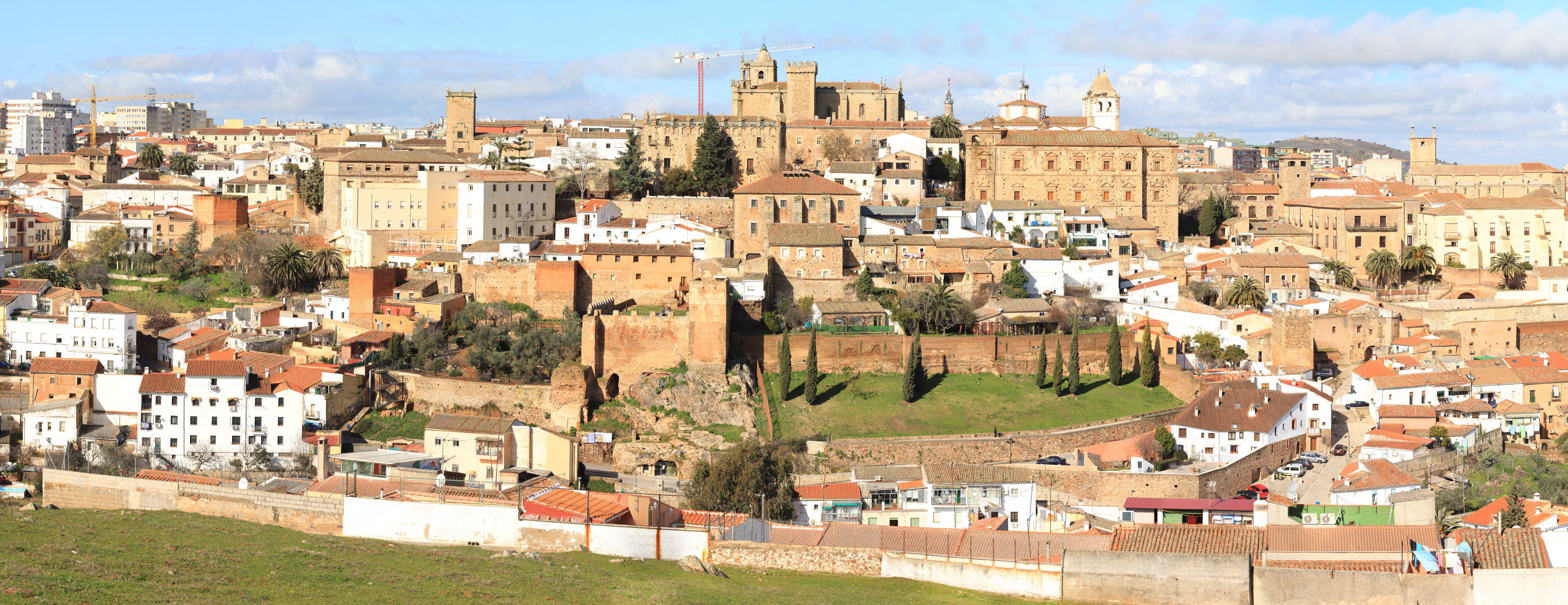
The municipality of Cáceres is the largest municipality by population in the province

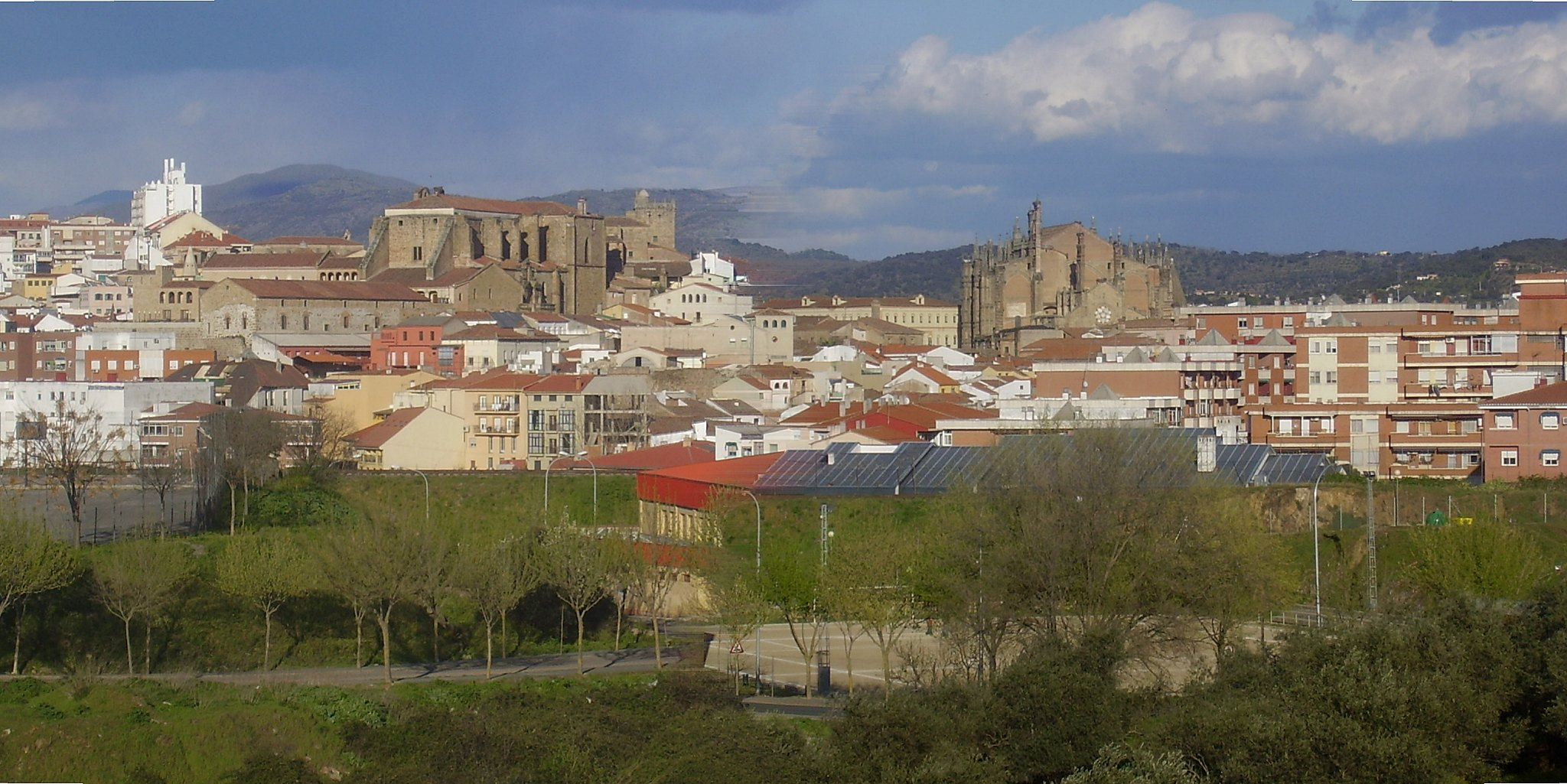
Plasencia is the second largest municipality by population in Cáceres

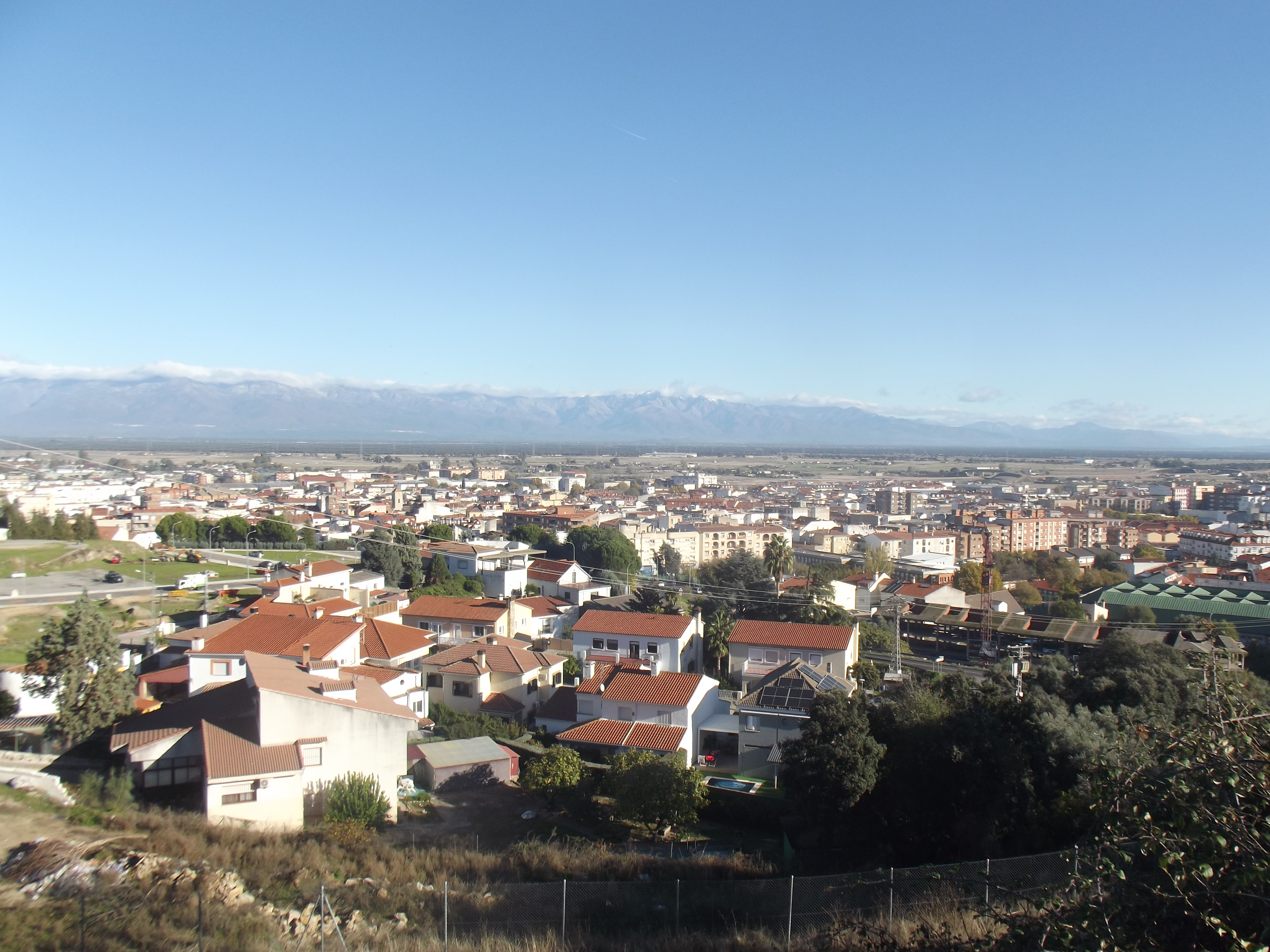
The third largest municipality by population in Cáceres is Navalmoral de la Mata

| Name | Population (2025) |
|---|---|
| Abadía | 337 |
| Abertura | 362 |
| Acebo | 567 |
| Acehúche | 808 |
| Aceituna | 569 |
| Ahigal | 1,340 |
| Alagón del Río | 919 |
| Albalá | 647 |
| Alcántara | 1,329 |
| Alcollarín | 259 |
| Alcuéscar | 2,447 |
| Aldea del Cano | 609 |
| La Aldea del Obispo | 290 |
| Aldeacentenera | 603 |
| Aldeanueva de la Vera | 1,966 |
| Aldeanueva del Camino | 696 |
| Aldehuela de Jerte | 348 |
| Alía | 722 |
| Aliseda | 1,726 |
| Almaraz | 1,594 |
| Almoharín | 1,771 |
| Arroyo de la Luz | 5,495 |
| Arroyomolinos | 816 |
| Arroyomolinos de la Vera | 424 |
| Baños de Montemayor | 738 |
| Barrado | 383 |
| Belvís de Monroy | 774 |
| Benquerencia | 74 |
| Berrocalejo | 120 |
| Berzocana | 375 |
| Bohonal de Ibor | 488 |
| Botija | 184 |
| Brozas | 1,718 |
| Cabañas del Castillo | 406 |
| Cabezabellosa | 317 |
| Cabezuela del Valle | 2,049 |
| Cabrero | 353 |
| Cáceres | 96,651 |
| Cachorrilla | 83 |
| Cadalso | 394 |
| Calzadilla | 450 |
| Caminomorisco | 1,097 |
| Campillo de Deleitosa | 82 |
| Campo Lugar | 790 |
| Cañamero | 1,578 |
| Cañaveral | 995 |
| Carbajo | 183 |
| Carcaboso | 1,076 |
| Carrascalejo | 223 |
| Casar de Cáceres | 4,511 |
| Casar de Palomero | 991 |
| Casares de las Hurdes | 362 |
| Casas de Don Antonio | 167 |
| Casas de Don Gómez | 342 |
| Casas de Millán | 536 |
| Casas de Miravete | 106 |
| Casas del Castañar | 583 |
| Casas del Monte | 761 |
| Casatejada | 1,393 |
| Casillas de Coria | 354 |
| Castañar de Ibor | 1,020 |
| Ceclavín | 1,769 |
| Cedillo | 453 |
| Cerezo | 147 |
| Cilleros | 1,547 |
| Collado de la Vera | 274 |
| Conquista de la Sierra | 193 |
| Coria | 12,001 |
| Cuacos de Yuste | 809 |
| La Cumbre | 815 |
| Deleitosa | 681 |
| Descargamaría | 105 |
| Eljas | 827 |
| Escurial | 855 |
| Fresnedoso de Ibor | 236 |
| Galisteo | 849 |
| Garciaz | 666 |
| La Garganta | 353 |
| Garganta la Olla | 874 |
| Gargantilla | 346 |
| Gargüera de la Vera | 187 |
| Garrovillas de Alconétar | 1,941 |
| Garvín | 101 |
| Gata | 1,335 |
| El Gordo | 363 |
| La Granja | 313 |
| Guadalupe | 1,722 |
| Guijo de Coria | 180 |
| Guijo de Galisteo | 1,460 |
| Guijo de Granadilla | 497 |
| Guijo de Santa Bárbara | 386 |
| Herguijuela | 264 |
| Hernán-Pérez | 401 |
| Herrera de Alcántara | 225 |
| Herreruela | 322 |
| Hervás | 3,898 |
| Higuera de Albalat | 102 |
| Hinojal | 391 |
| Holguera | 588 |
| Hoyos | 848 |
| Huélaga | 203 |
| Ibahernando | 538 |
| Jaraicejo | 418 |
| Jaraíz de la Vera | 6,831 |
| Jarandilla de la Vera | 2,894 |
| Jarilla | 127 |
| Jerte | 1,189 |
| Ladrillar | 177 |
| Logrosán | 1,852 |
| Losar de la Vera | 2,799 |
| Madrigal de la Vera | 1,536 |
| Madrigalejo | 2,122 |
| Madroñera | 2,349 |
| Majadas de Tiétar | 1,281 |
| Malpartida de Cáceres | 4,027 |
| Malpartida de Plasencia | 4,666 |
| Marchagaz | 231 |
| Mata de Alcántara | 300 |
| Membrío | 587 |
| Mesas de Ibor | 146 |
| Miajadas | 9,396 |
| Millanes | 239 |
| Mirabel | 620 |
| Mohedas de Granadilla | 817 |
| Monroy | 909 |
| Montánchez | 1,597 |
| Montehermoso | 5,552 |
| Moraleja | 6,562 |
| Morcillo | 378 |
| Navaconcejo | 2,037 |
| Navalmoral de la Mata | 17,352 |
| Navalvillar de Ibor | 374 |
| Navas del Madroño | 1,254 |
| Navezuelas | 668 |
| Nuñomoral | 1,196 |
| Oliva de Plasencia | 290 |
| Palomero | 450 |
| Pasarón de la Vera | 588 |
| Pedroso de Acim | 90 |
| Peraleda de la Mata | 1,444 |
| Peraleda de San Román | 268 |
| Perales del Puerto | 874 |
| Pescueza | 150 |
| La Pesga | 950 |
| Piedras Albas | 125 |
| Pinofranqueado | 1,783 |
| Piornal | 1,443 |
| Plasencia | 40,132 |
| Plasenzuela | 536 |
| Portaje | 379 |
| Portezuelo | 196 |
| Pozuelo de Zarzón | 430 |
| Puerto de Santa Cruz | 268 |
| Rebollar | 203 |
| Riolobos | 1,173 |
| Robledillo de Gata | 91 |
| Robledillo de la Vera | 252 |
| Robledillo de Trujillo | 394 |
| Robledollano | 325 |
| Romangordo | 240 |
| Rosalejo | 1,268 |
| Ruanes | 82 |
| Salorino | 522 |
| Salvatierra de Santiago | 229 |
| San Martín de Trevejo | 693 |
| Santa Ana | 302 |
| Santa Cruz de la Sierra | 317 |
| Santa Cruz de Paniagua | 286 |
| Santa Marta de Magasca | 291 |
| Santiago de Alcántara | 454 |
| Santiago del Campo | 250 |
| Santibáñez el Alto | 386 |
| Santibáñez el Bajo | 711 |
| Saucedilla | 1,002 |
| Segura de Toro | 190 |
| Serradilla | 1,448 |
| Serrejón | 410 |
| Sierra de Fuentes | 2,081 |
| Talaván | 775 |
| Talaveruela de la Vera | 303 |
| Talayuela | 7,439 |
| Tejeda de Tiétar | 761 |
| Toril | 157 |
| Tornavacas | 989 |
| El Torno | 805 |
| Torre de Don Miguel | 481 |
| Torre de Santa María | 508 |
| Torrecilla de los Ángeles | 642 |
| Torrecillas de la Tiesa | 1,038 |
| Torrejón el Rubio | 537 |
| Torrejoncillo | 2,743 |
| Torremenga | 620 |
| Torremocha | 742 |
| Torreorgaz | 1,641 |
| Torrequemada | 564 |
| Trujillo | 8,611 |
| Valdastillas | 332 |
| Valdecañas de Tajo | 94 |
| Valdefuentes | 1,104 |
| Valdehúncar | 188 |
| Valdelacasa de Tajo | 338 |
| Valdemorales | 218 |
| Valdeobispo | 617 |
| Valencia de Alcántara | 5,150 |
| Valverde de la Vera | 590 |
| Valverde del Fresno | 2,143 |
| Viandar de la Vera | 216 |
| Villa del Campo | 435 |
| Villa del Rey | 118 |
| Villamesías | 271 |
| Villamiel | 379 |
| Villanueva de la Sierra | 478 |
| Villanueva de la Vera | 2,108 |
| Villar de Plasencia | 224 |
| Villar del Pedroso | 547 |
| Villasbuenas de Gata | 481 |
| Zarza de Granadilla | 1,815 |
| Zarza de Montánchez | 504 |
| Zarza la Mayor | 1,096 |
| Zorita | 1,223 |

== See also ==
- Geography of Spain
- List of Spanish cities
