= Torre de Don Miguel =

Torre de Don Miguel, Spain
- Municipality
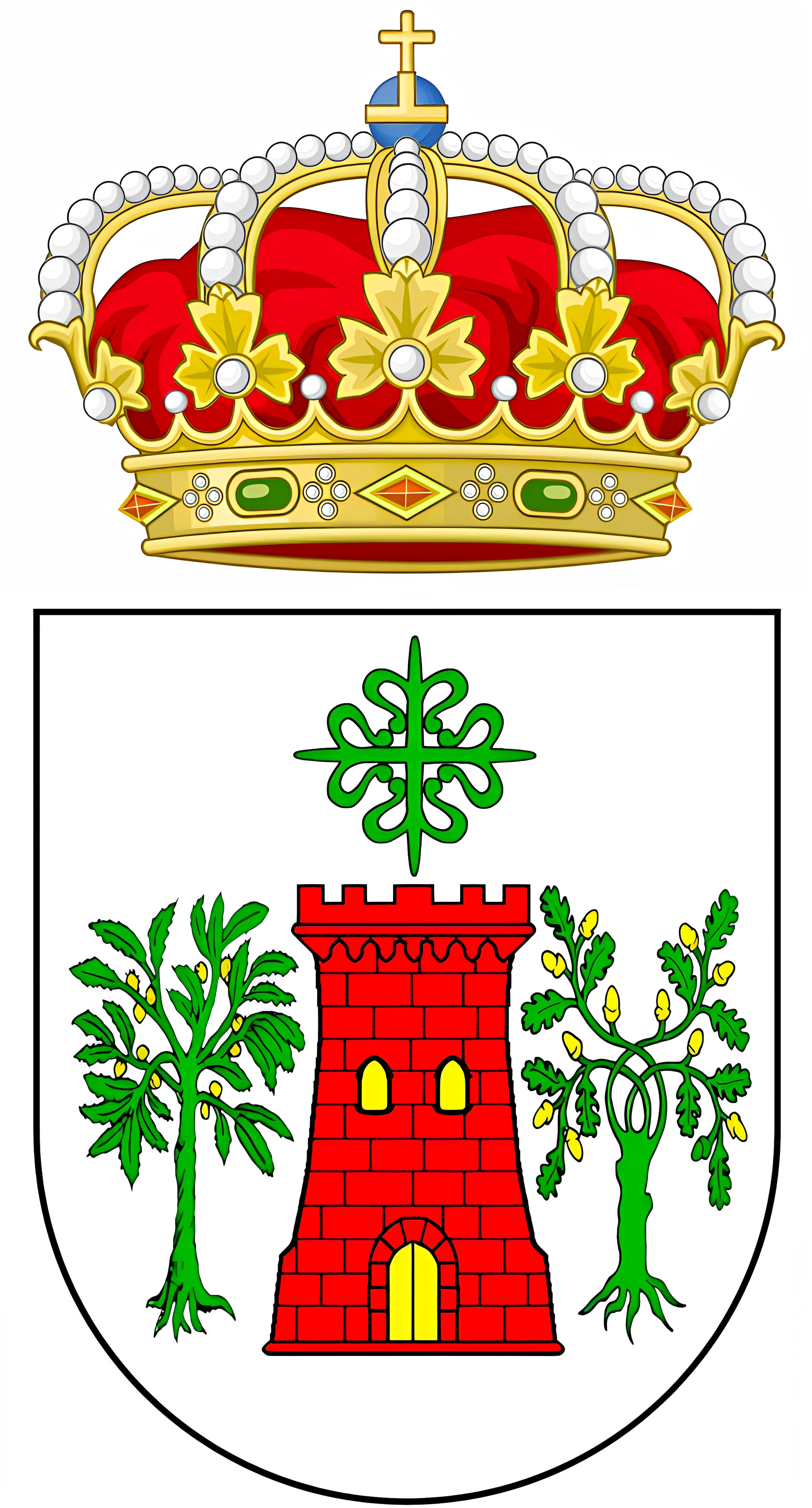
- Coat of arms

- Location within Spain
- Coordinates: 40°13′N 6°34′W
- Country: Spain
- Autonomous community: Extremadura
- Province: Cáceres
- Municipality: Torre de Don Miguel

Area
  - Total: 12 km^{2} (4.6 sq mi)
- Elevation: 559 m (1,834 ft)

Population (2025-01-01)
  - Total: 481
  - Density: 40/km^{2} (100/sq mi)
- Time zone: UTC+1 (CET)
  - Summer (DST): UTC+2 (CEST)

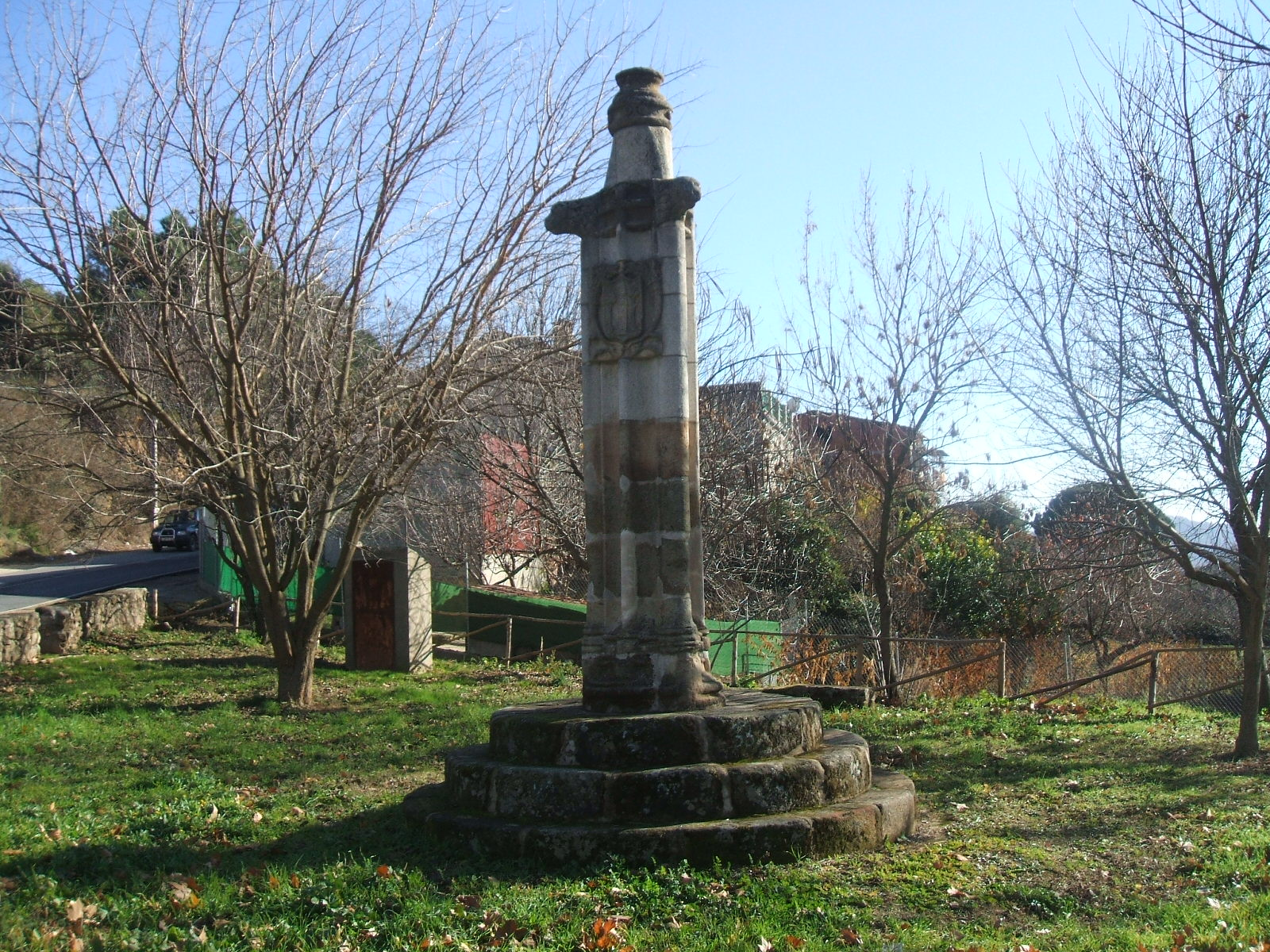
Torre de Don Miguel

Torre de Don Miguel is a municipality located in the province of Cáceres, Extremadura, Spain. According to the 2005 census (INE), the municipality has a population of 612 inhabitants.

== See also ==
- List of municipalities in Cáceres
