= Campillo de Deleitosa =

- municipality
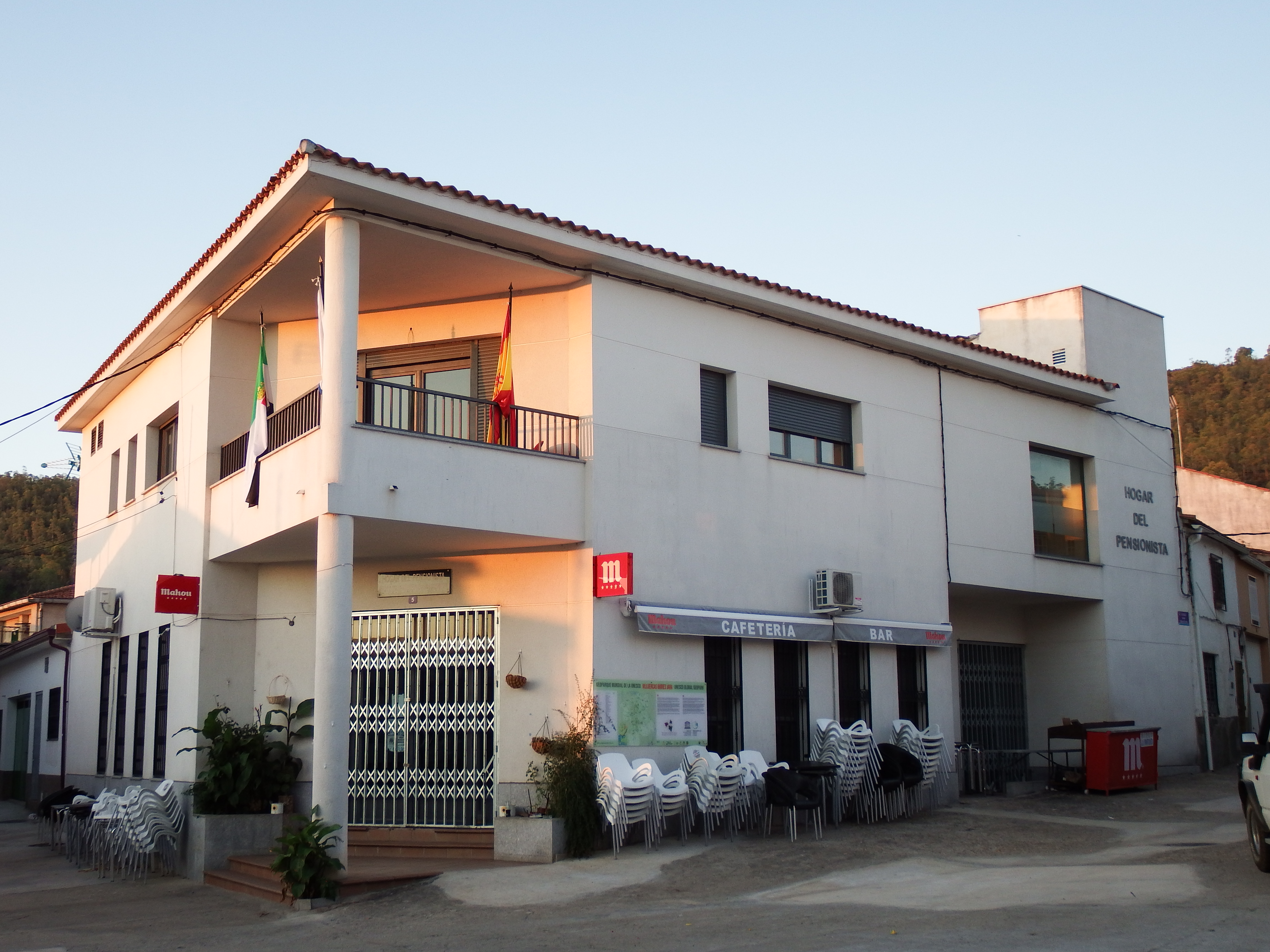
- Town hall

- Flag Coat of arms

- Location in Spain.
- Coordinates: 39°42′N 5°34′W
- Country: Spain
- Autonomous community: Extremadura
- Province: Cáceres
- Comarca: Las Villuercas / Los Ibores

Government
  - Mayor: Fermín Sánchez

Area
  - Total: 25.6 km^{2} (9.9 sq mi)

Population (2025-01-01)
  - Total: 82
  - Density: 3.2/km^{2} (8.3/sq mi)
- Time zone: UTC+1 (CET)
  - Summer (DST): UTC+2 (CEST)

Campillo de Deleitosa is a municipality located in the province of Cáceres, Extremadura, Spain.

It has been described as the smallest and oldest town in Extremadura.

== See also ==
- List of municipalities in Cáceres
