= La Cumbre, Spain =

Coordinates: 39.405°N 5.976°W

La Cumbre is a village in the province of Cáceres and autonomous community of Extremadura, Spain. The municipality covers an area of 113.52 km^{2} (43.83 sq mi) and in 2011 had a population of 974.

== See also ==
- List of municipalities in Cáceres
