= List of municipalities in Extremadura =

Map of Spain with the province of Extremadura highlighted

This is a list of the municipalities in the autonomous community of Extremadura, Spain. There are 388 municipalities.

Name	Population (2002)
Abadía	297
Abertura	509
Acebo	784
Acedera	897
Acehúche	925
Aceituna	657
Aceuchal	5344
Ahigal	1479
Ahillones	1158
Alange	2038
Albalá	859
Alburquerque	5622
Alcántara	1769
Alcollarín	343
Alconchel	2042
Alconera	737
Alcuéscar	2919
Aldea del Cano	772
Aldeacentenera	899
Aldeanueva de la Vera	2463
Aldeanueva del Camino	836
Aldehuela de Jerte	367
Alía	1321
Aliseda	2010
Aljucén	260
Almaraz	1425
Almendral	1404
Almendralejo	30784
Almoharín	2142
Arroyo de la Luz	6522
Arroyo de San Serván	3922
Arroyomolinos	1135
Arroyomolinos de la Vera	564
Atalaya	353
Azuaga	8580
Badajoz	136851
Baños de Montemayor	718
Barcarrota	3616
Barrado	513
Baterno	389
Belvís de Monroy	606
Benquerencia	118
Benquerencia de la Serena	980
Berlanga	2637
Berrocalejo	118
Berzocana	567
Bienvenida	2350
Bodonal de la Sierra	1208
Bohonal de Ibor	574
Botija	164
Brozas	2329
Burguillos del Cerro	3243
Cabañas del Castillo	523
Cabeza del Buey	5957
Cabeza la Vaca	1610
Cabezabellosa	485
Cabezuela del Valle	2310
Cabrero	415
Cáceres	84439
Cachorrilla	104
Cadalso	580
Calamonte	6136
Calera de León	1093
Calzadilla	554
Calzadilla de los Barros	855
Caminomorisco	1265
Campanario	5723
Campillo de Deleitosa	120
Campillo de Llerena	1731
Campo Lugar	1198
Cañamero	1838
Cañaveral	1357
Capilla	212
Carbajo	271
Carcaboso	1087
Carmonita	639
Carrascalejo	394
Casar de Cácerces	4757
Casar de Palomero	1289
Casares de las Hurdes	649
Casas de Don Antonio	218
Casas de Don Gómez	336
Casas de Don Pedro	1737
Casas de Millán	773
Casas de Miravete	194
Casas de Reina	228
Casas del Castañar	671
Casas del Monte	925
Casatejada	1264
Casillas de Coria	565
Castañar de Ibor	1262
Castilblanco	1293
Castuera	6989
Ceclavín	2189
Cedillo	553
Cerezo	217
Cheles	1332
Cilleros	2102
Collado	227
Conquista de la Sierra	215
Cordobilla de Lácara	1026
Coria	12781
Corte de Peleas	1297
Cristina	548
Cuacos de Yuste	961
Deleitosa	880
Descargamaría	227
Don Álvaro	668
Don Benito	32023
El Carrascalejo	75
El Gordo	288
El Torno	925
Eljas	1198
Entrín Bajo	639
Escurial	908
Esparragalejo	1532
Esparragosa de la Serena	1129
Esparragosa de Lares	1107
Feria	1435
Fregenal de la Sierra	5925
Fresnedoso de Ibor	344
Fuenlabrada de los Montes	2046
Fuente de Cantos	5059
Fuente del Arco	776
Fuente del Maestre	6819
Fuentes de León	2718
Galisteo	1955
Garbayuela	547
Garciaz	979
Gargáligas	650
Garganta la Olla	1157
Gargantilla	478
Gargüera	181
Garlitos	774
Garrovillas de Alconétar	2457
Garvín	118
Gata	1846
Granja de Torrehermosa	2533
Guadalupe	2325
Guareña	7383
Guijo de Coria	286
Guijo de Galisteo	1839
Guijo de Granadilla	721
Guijo de Santa Bárbara	467
Helechosa de los Montes	764
Herguijuela	428
Hernán-Perez	502
Herrerra de Alcántara	320
Herrerra del Duque	3836
Herreruela	326
Hervás	3881
Higuera	110
Higuera de la Serena	1208
Higuera de Llerena	422
Higuera de Vargas	2194
Higuera la Real	2551
Hinojal	428
Hinojosa del Valle	593
Holguera	825
Hornachos	3832
Hoyos	1017
Huélaga	207
Ibahernando	658
Jaraicejo	676
Jaraíz de la Vera	6754
Jarandilla de la Vera	3077
Jarilla	160
Jerez de los Caballeros	9613
Jerte	1327
La Albuera	1799
La Aldea del Obispo	353
La Codosera	2309
La Coronada	2409
La Cumbre	1121
La Garganta	593
La Garrovilla	2599
La Granja	392
La Haba	1471
La Lapa	315
La Morera	786
La Nava de Santiago	1146
La Parra	1416
La Pesga	1187
La Roca de la Sierra	1590
La Zarza	3619
Ladrillar	298
Llera	955
Llerena	5549
Lobón	2666
Logrosán	2386
Los Santos de Maimona	7899
Losar de la Vera	3198
Madrigal de la Vera	1794
Madrigalejo	2122
Madroñera	3127
Magacela	666
Maguilla	1120
Majadas	1209
Malcocinado	533
Malpartida de Cáceres	4412
Malpartida de la Serena	765
Malpartida de Plasencia	4310
Manchita	754
Marchagaz	307
Mata de Alcántara	366
Medellín	2378
Medina de las Torres	1494
Membrío	883
Mengabril	450
Mérida	50780
Mesas de Ibor	215
Miajadas	9065
Millanes	217
Mirabel	790
Mirandilla	1358
Mohedas de Granadilla	1105
Monesterio	4610
Monroy	1014
Montánchez	2153
Montehermoso	5493
Montemolín	1652
Monterrubio de la Serena	2920
Montijo	15453
Moraleja	8095
Morcillo	462
Navaconcejo	2122
Navalmoral de la Mata	15233
Navalvillar de Ibor	494
Navalvillar de Pela	4870
Navas del Madroño	1511
Navezuelas	708
Nogales	756
Nuñomoral	1668
Oliva de la Frontera	5881
Oliva de Mérida	1963
Oliva de Plasencia	276
Olivenza	10762
Orellana de la Sierra	340
Orellana la Vieja	3728
Palomas	726
Palomero	530
Pasarón de la Vera	711
Pedroso de Acim	134
Peñalsordo	1463
Peraleda de la Mata	1506
Peraleda de San Román	391
Peraleda del Zaucejo	634
Perales del Puerto	1015
Pescueza	189
Piedras Albas	186
Pinofranqueado	1593
Piornal	1554
Plasencia	38495
Plasenzuela	503
Portaje	401
Portezuelo	299
Pozuelo de Zarzón	601
Puebla de Alcocer	1414
Puebla de la Calzada	5527
Puebla de la Reina	907
Puebla de Obando	2045
Puebla de Sancho Pérez	2891
Puebla del Maestre	906
Puebla del Prior	565
Pueblanueva del Guadiana	1987
Puerto de Santa Cruz	415
Quintana de la Serena	5150
Rebollar	240
Reina	217
Rena	657
Retamal de Llerena	528
Ribera del Fresno	3398
Riolobos	1477
Risco	219
Robledillo de Gata	164
Robledillo de la Vera	325
Robledillo de Trujillo	490
Robledollano	409
Romangordo	190
Rosalejo	1706
Ruanes	102
Salornio	732
Salvaleón	2177
Salvatierra de los Barros	1927
Salvatierra de Santiago	434
San Martín de Trevejo	959
San Pedro de Mérida	829
San Vicente de Alcántara	5908
Sancti-Spíritus	287
Santa Amalia	4398
Santa Ana	351
Santa Cruz de la Sierra	346
Santa Cruz de Paniagua	417
Santa Marta	4157
Santa Marta de Magasca	287
Santiago de Alcántara	741
Santiago del Campo	326
Santibáñez el Alto	537
Santibáñez el Bajo	994
Saucedilla	627
Segura de León	2297
Segura de Toro	205
Serradilla	1864
Serrejón	485
Sierra de Fuentes	1821
Siruela	2391
Solana de los Barros	2750
Talarrubias	3609
Talaván	967
Talavera la Real	5255
Talaveruela de la Vera	424
Talayuela	10328
Táliga	738
Tamurejo	276
Tejeda de Tiétar	1015
Toril	202
Tornavacas	1334
Torre de Don Miguel	638
Torre de Miguel Sesmero	1274
Torre de Santa María	711
Torrecilla de los Ángeles	768
Torrecillas de la Tiesa	1154
Torrejón el Rubio	654
Torremayor	1044
Torremejía	2091
Torremenga	626
Torremocha	1227
Torreorgaz	1670
Torrequemada	613
Trasierra	718
Trujillanos	1379
Trujillo	9456
Usagre	2072
Valdastillas	358
Valdecaballeros	1384
Valdecañas de Tajo	230
Valdefuentes	1491
Valdehúncar	221
Valdelacalzada	2599
Valdelacasa de Tajo	484
Valdemorales	268
Valdeobispo	809
Valdetorres	1379
Valencia de Alcántara	6136
Valencia de las Torres	811
Valencia del Mombuey	793
Valencia del Ventoso	2307
Valle de la Serena	1532
Valle de Matamoros	491
Valle de Santa Ana	1220
Valverde de Burguillos	372
Valverde de la Vera	540
Valverde de Leganés	3804
Valverde de Llerena	803
Valverde de Mérida	1138
Valverde del Fresno	2654
Viandar de la Vera	306
Villa del Campo	629
Villa del Rey	179
Villafranca de los Barros	12568
Villagarcía de la Torre	1023
Villagonzalo	1410
Villalba de los Barros	1696
Villamesías	345
Villamiel	682
Villanueva de la Serena	24191
Villanueva de la Sierra	615
Villanueva del Fresno	3497
Villar de Plasencia	256
Villar de Rena	1627
Villar del Pedroso	779
Villar del Rey	2322
Villarta de los Montes	645
Villasbuenas de Gata	505
Zafra	15373
Zahínos	3026
Zalamea de la Serena	4554
Zarza de Granadilla	1749
Zarza de Montánchez	617
Zarza la Mayor	1666
Zarza-Capilla	483
Zorita	1923

== See also ==
- Geography of Spain
- List of Spanish cities
