= Villar de Plasencia =

- Coat of arms

- Villar de Plasencia
- Coordinates: 40°8′17″N 6°1′40″W
- Country: Spain
- Autonomous community: Extremadura
- Province: Cáceres

Area
  - Total: 25.2 km^{2} (9.7 sq mi)
- Elevation: 470 m (1,540 ft)

Population (2025-01-01)
  - Total: 224
  - Density: 8.89/km^{2} (23.0/sq mi)
- Time zone: UTC+1 (CET)
  - Summer (DST): UTC+2 (CEST)
- Website: www.villardeplasencia.es

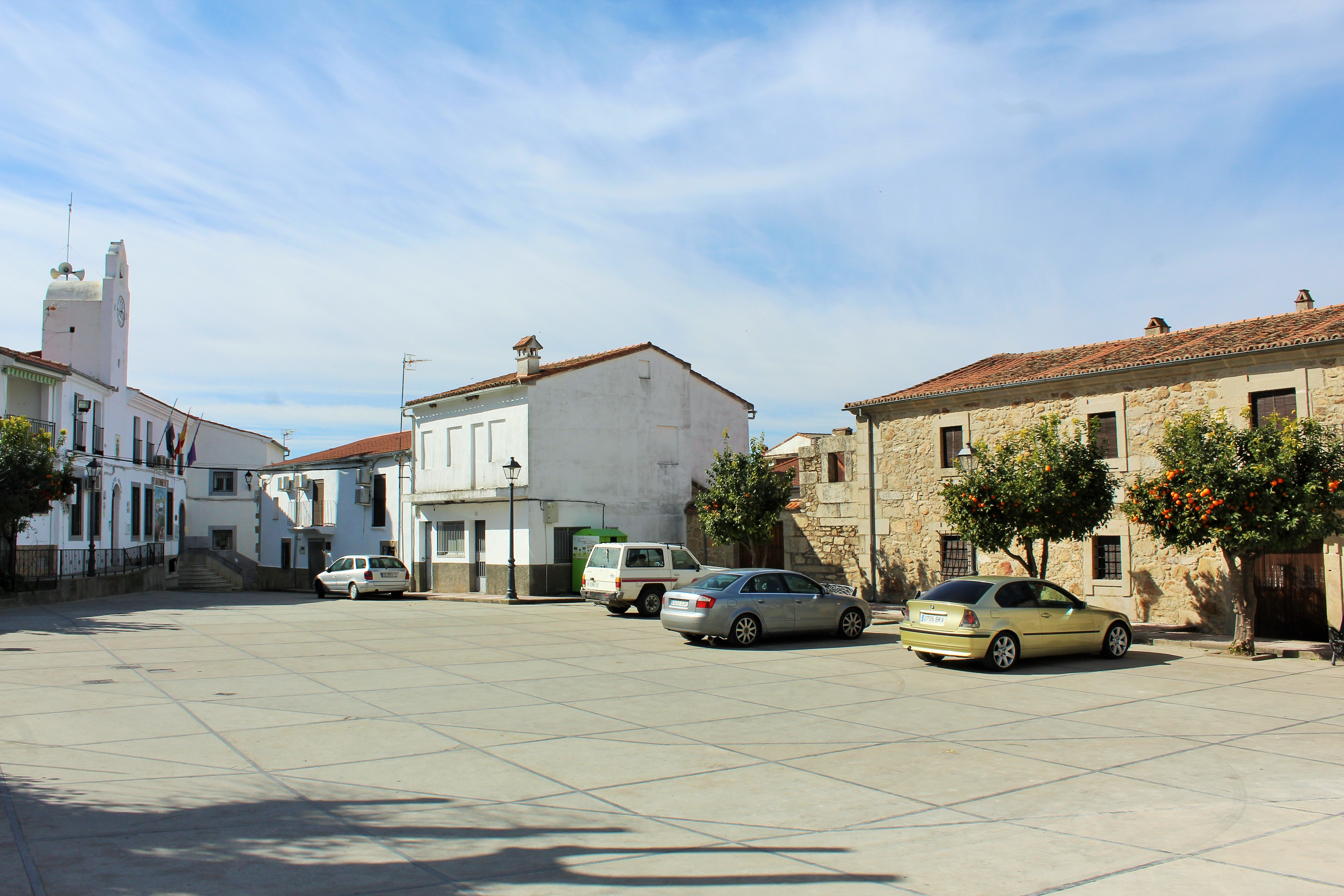
Main square with the town hall and manor house

Villar de Plasencia is a municipality located in the province of Cáceres, in the autonomous community of Extremadura, Spain. The municipality covers an area of 24.99 square kilometres (9.65 sq mi) and as of 2011 has a population of 243 people.

== Geography and Climate ==
It is located on the western slope of a mountain range of the Region of Extremadura called Montes de Tras la Sierra. The climate is subtropical with an average annual temperature of 14.5°C. The native vegetation in the lower areas of the territory is a Mediterranean sclerophyllous forest made up mainly of holm oaks and cork oaks. It borders Guijo and Zarza de Granadilla to the west. Jarilla to the north, and Cabezabellosa and Oliva de Plasencia to the south and east.

== Origin and history ==
Villar de Plasencia is a municipality located in the Valle del Ambroz region, outside the Mancomunidad del Ambroz. Its history is deeply marked by the intersection of two important routes: the Roman Road, which linked the cities of Astorga and Mérida, and the Cañada Real de la Vizana, a transhumance route connecting the Asturian lakes with the lands of Badajoz. Both routes have played a pivotal role in the social, political, and economic evolution of the municipality over the centuries.

=== Prehistory ===
The origins of Villar de Plasencia are lost in antiquity. Evidence of lithic industries in the region indicates sparse settlement during the Bronze Age, with residents dwelling in caves or temporary outdoor shelters. Not until the end of the third millennium and the beginning of the second millennium BC, during the Chalcolithic era, are there signs of some sedentism in the area near Villar de Plasencia.

During the Iron Age, small Vetton fortifications (framontanos) began to appear in the area. Remnants of a possible fortification of this type may be found near the Parish Church of Villar de Plasencia, a location that would allow control of the valley's passage and movements on the slopes.

=== Roman era ===
The definitive Romanization of the Iberian Peninsula's west introduced the first urban nuclei, hierarchizing the Ambroz map around the Silver Route (Via de la Plata) and the branches connecting the older settlements of Galisteo and the pass at Puerto de Béjar. During this era, Cáparra, a stipendiary city of Lusitania, emerged, transforming the concept of territoriality in the region.

The foundational nucleus of what would become Villar de Plasencia is believed to have been a "villae," a type of Roman rural estate. The villae erected near the current railway station may have given the place its name and served as a reference for the city of Cáparra to control the water flowing through an aqueduct from the Nymph of Jarilla (Piedras Labradas) and the health baths of Salugral.

=== Middle Ages ===
The Middle Ages ushered in a new era for Villar de Plasencia. With the Berber invasion, the Roman road infrastructure was adapted for pastoral uses, and surveillance points were established along the Plasencia fault. During this time, the Silver Route, now known as Balata and later Quinea (or Lindón, in the area), lost its status as an imperial highway, with the original Roman villae disappearing.

=== 16th to 19th centuries ===
During the 16th and 17th centuries, the population of Villar de Plasencia grew slowly. During this period, the municipality's main economic activity was agriculture, particularly the cultivation of cereals and grapes.

In the 19th century, the passage of the War of Independence and the Carlist Wars through the region struck a harsh blow to the economy and population of Villar de Plasencia. However, the town managed to recover and began to develop again in the late 19th century, when the construction of the Palazuelo-Astorga railway line led to an increase in trade and economic activity.

=== 20th and 21st centuries ===
The 20th century was a period of growth and modernization for Villar de Plasencia. Improvements in infrastructure and the creation of new public services contributed to improving the quality of life for its inhabitants.

In the 21st century, the municipality has focused on preserving its historical and cultural heritage, while seeking to promote tourism. The hiking routes along the Silver Route and the archaeological remains from the Roman and Medieval periods attract visitors from all over Spain and abroad.

== Heritage ==
The most significant monument of the town, the Parish of "Nuestra Señora de la Asunción" (Our Lady of Assumption), is situated on the plain of the church. This 16th-century building has various late Gothic influences and was sponsored by the Bishop of Plasencia in 1524, Vargas Carvajal, whose coat of arms is installed in the tower. Internally, the church is organized by a polygonal header and a long nave of three sections divided by semi-circular arches that rest on Gothic pillars and support a gabled wooden roof. The presbytery is roofed with beautiful Mudejar woodwork, decorated with latticework.

The town also preserves two Baroque hermitages, dedicated to its patron "San Bartolomé" (Saint Bartholomew) and "San Antonio de Padua" (Saint Anthony of Padua). The first one, made of masonry, consists of a nave and presbytery closed with a dome on pendentives. The second one is located next to a bridge built by the Bishop of Plasencia, José González Laso Santos de San Pedro, in 1792. Moreover, this town is the starting point of the royal road to Plasencia.

== See also ==
- List of municipalities in Cáceres
