= Province of Cáceres =

Province of Spain

Province of Cáceres Provincia de Caçris (Extremaduran) Provincia de Cáceres (Spanish) Província de Cáceres (Portuguese) Provincia de Cáciris (Fala)
- Province
- Flag Coat of arms

- Location of the Province of Cáceres in Spain
- Coordinates: 39°40′N 6°00′W
- Country: Spain
- Autonomous community: Extremadura
- Capital: Cáceres
- Municipalities: 223

Area
  - Total: 19,864.50 km^{2} (7,669.73 sq mi)
  - Rank: 2nd in Spain

Population (2025)
  - Total: 388,190
  - Rank: 35th in Spain
  - Density: 19.542/km^{2} (50.613/sq mi)
- Time zone: UTC+1 (CET)
  - Summer (DST): UTC+2 (CEST)
- Official language(s): Spanish
- Parliament: Cortes Generales

The province of Cáceres (Spanish: provincia de Cáceres; Portuguese: província de Cáceres; Extremaduran: provincia de Caçris; Fala: provincia de Cáciris) is a province of western Spain, which makes up the northern half of the autonomous community of Extremadura. Its capital is the city of Cáceres. Other cities in the province include Plasencia, Coria, Navalmoral de la Mata, and Trujillo, the birthplace of Francisco Pizarro González.

The province was formed in 1839, and is bordered by the provinces of Salamanca, Ávila, Toledo and Badajoz in the south and by Portugal in the west.

It has a population of 388,190 in an area of 19,864.50 square kilometres (7,669.73 sq mi) across its 223 municipalities.

The Tagus river runs through the province.

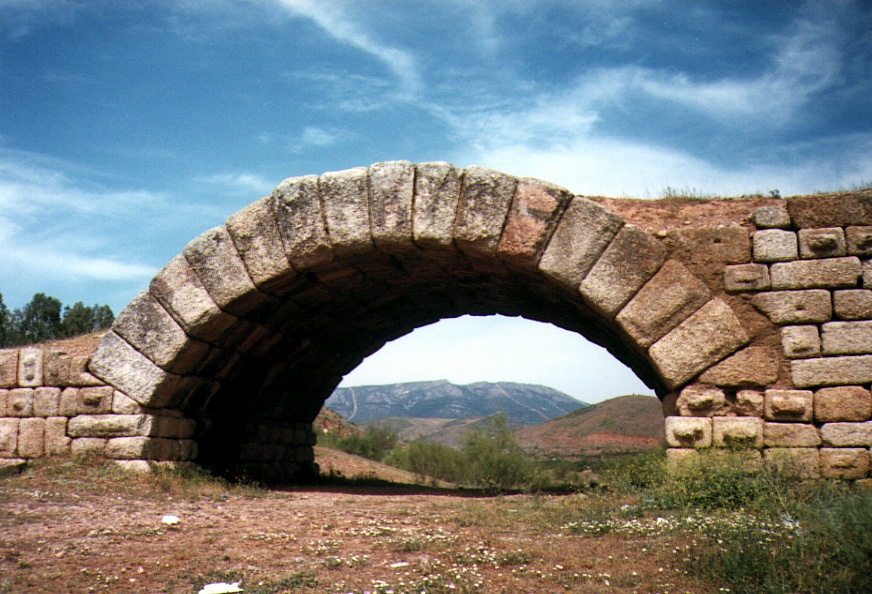
Part of the Roman Alconétar Bridge, Cáceres province

== Geography ==
The northern natural border of the province is formed by the east–west running Sierra de Gredos which is part of the Sistema Central. The valleys North of Cáceres include the Valle del Jerte, the gorges of la Vera, the Ambroz Valley, and Las Hurdes with mountain rivers and natural pools. The southern border consists of the Montes de Toledo. The remainder of the province is a plain, through which the river Tagus and its tributaries run. The mountains are rich in wildlife, and in 1979, a nature park was created at Monfragüe.

== Administrative divisions ==
The province comprises 223 municipalities. Traditional comarcas without administrative function in the province are Las Villuercas, Las Hurdes, and Monfragüe. Las Hurdes was one of the poorest regions in Spain's history.

The municipalities are:

- Abadía
- Abertura
- Acebo
- Acehúche
- Aceituna
- Ahigal
- Alagón del Río
- Albalá
- Alcántara
- Alcollarín
- Alcuéscar
- Aldea del Cano
- Aldeacentenera
- Aldeanueva de la Vera
- Aldeanueva del Camino
- Aldehuela de Jerte
- Alía
- Aliseda
- Almaraz
- Almoharín
- Arroyo de la Luz
- Arroyomolinos de la Vera
- Arroyomolinos
- Baños de Montemayor
- Barrado
- Belvís de Monroy
- Benquerencia
- Berrocalejo
- Berzocana
- Bohonal de Ibor
- Botija
- Brozas
- Cabañas del Castillo
- Cabezabellosa
- Cabezuela del Valle
- Cabrero
- Cáceres
- Cachorrilla
- Cadalso
- Calzadilla
- Caminomorisco
- Campillo de Deleitosa
- Campo Lugar
- Cañamero
- Cañaveral
- Carbajo
- Carcaboso
- Carrascalejo
- Casar de Cáceres
- Casar de Palomero
- Casares de las Hurdes
- Casas de Don Antonio
- Casas de Don Gómez
- Casas de Millán
- Casas de Miravete
- Casas del Castañar
- Casas del Monte
- Casatejada
- Casillas de Coria
- Castañar de Ibor
- Ceclavín
- Cedillo
- Cerezo
- Cilleros
- Collado de la Vera
- Conquista de la Sierra
- Coria
- Cuacos de Yuste
- Deleitosa
- Descargamaría
- El Gordo
- El Torno
- Eljas
- Escurial
- Fresnedoso de Ibor
- Galisteo
- Garciaz
- Garganta la Olla
- Gargantilla
- Gargüera de la Vera
- Garrovillas de Alconétar
- Garvín
- Gata
- Guadalupe
- Guijo de Coria
- Guijo de Galisteo
- Guijo de Granadilla
- Guijo de Santa Bárbara
- Herguijuela
- Hernán-Pérez
- Herrera de Alcántara
- Herreruela
- Hervás
- Higuera de Albalat
- Hinojal
- Holguera
- Hoyos
- Huélaga
- Ibahernando
- Jaraicejo
- Jaraíz de la Vera
- Jarandilla de la Vera
- Jarilla
- Jerte
- La Aldea del Obispo
- La Cumbre
- La Garganta
- La Granja
- La Pesga
- Ladrillar
- Logrosán
- Losar de la Vera
- Madrigal de la Vera
- Madrigalejo
- Madroñera
- Majadas de Tiétar
- Malpartida de Cáceres
- Malpartida de Plasencia
- Marchagaz
- Mata de Alcántara
- Membrío
- Mesas de Ibor
- Miajadas
- Millanes
- Mirabel
- Mohedas de Granadilla
- Monroy
- Montánchez
- Montehermoso
- Moraleja
- Morcillo
- Navaconcejo
- Navalmoral de la Mata
- Navalvillar de Ibor
- Navas del Madroño
- Navezuelas
- Nuñomoral
- Oliva de Plasencia
- Palomero
- Pasarón de la Vera
- Pedroso de Acim
- Peraleda de la Mata
- Peraleda de San Román
- Perales del Puerto
- Pescueza
- Piedras Albas
- Pinofranqueado
- Piornal
- Plasencia
- Plasenzuela
- Portaje
- Portezuelo
- Pozuelo de Zarzón
- Pueblonuevo de Miramontes
- Puerto de Santa Cruz
- Rebollar
- Riolobos
- Robledillo de Gata
- Robledillo de la Vera
- Robledillo de Trujillo
- Robledollano
- Romangordo
- Rosalejo
- Ruanes
- Salorino
- Salvatierra de Santiago
- San Martín de Trevejo
- Santa Ana
- Santa Cruz de la Sierra
- Santa Cruz de Paniagua
- Santa Marta de Magasca
- Santiago de Alcántara
- Santiago del Campo
- Santibáñez el Alto
- Santibáñez el Bajo
- Saucedilla
- Segura de Toro
- Serradilla
- Serrejón
- Sierra de Fuentes
- Talaván
- Talaveruela de la Vera
- Talayuela
- Tejeda de Tiétar
- Tiétar
- Toril
- Tornavacas
- Torre de Don Miguel
- Torre de Santa María
- Torrecilla de los Ángeles
- Torrecillas de la Tiesa
- Torrejón el Rubio
- Torrejoncillo
- Torremenga
- Torremocha
- Torreorgaz
- Torrequemada
- Trujillo
- Valdastillas
- Valdecañas de Tajo
- Valdefuentes
- Valdehúncar
- Valdelacasa de Tajo
- Valdemorales
- Valdeobispo
- Valencia de Alcántara
- Valverde de la Vera
- Valverde del Fresno
- Vegaviana
- Viandar de la Vera
- Villa del Campo
- Villa del Rey
- Villamesías
- Villamiel
- Villanueva de la Sierra
- Villanueva de la Vera
- Villar de Plasencia
- Villar del Pedroso
- Villasbuenas de Gata
- Zarza de Granadilla
- Zarza de Montánchez
- Zarza la Mayor
- Zorita

== Demographics ==
As of 2025, the population is 388,190, of which 49.5% are male, and 50.5% are female. Minors make up 14.1% of the population, and seniors make up 25.4%.

Historical population

Year	Pop.	±%
1842	330,129	—
1857	302,134	−8.5%
1877	297,969	−1.4%
1887	332,412	+11.6%
1900	355,313	+6.9%
1910	396,100	+11.5%
1920	413,162	+4.3%
1930	448,781	+8.6%
1940	505,162	+12.6%

Year	Pop.	±%
1950	548,256	+8.5%
1960	556,759	+1.6%
1970	467,687	−16.0%
1981	421,449	−9.9%
1991	411,464	−2.4%
2001	403,621	−1.9%
2011	412,701	+2.2%
2021	390,544	−5.4%

Source: INE

=== Immigration ===
As of 2025, immigrants make up 6.9% of the population. The 5 largest foreign countries of birth are Morocco, Colombia, Romania, Peru, and Portugal.

== Economy ==
The plain is fertile, and irrigation is used to raise cereals, tobacco, tomatoes, peppers and cherries, as well as cattle and pigs as some of the most important agricultural products.

The Gabriel y Galán dam, one of three on the Alagón River, produces most of the hydroelectric power for the province.

The municipality of Talaván in Cáceres is home to one of Spain's largest solar photovoltaic power plants, with a capacity of 300 MW.

== Sports ==
The province's main association football team is Cacereño, who currently play in the Segunda División B.
