= Fresnedoso de Ibor =

Coordinates: 39°41′N 5°30′W

Fresnedoso de Ibor, Spain
- municipality
- Flag Coat of arms
- Interactive map of Fresnedoso de Ibor, Spain
- Country: Spain
- Autonomous community: Extremadura
- Province: Cáceres
- Municipality: Fresnedoso de Ibor

Area
  - Total: 54 km^{2} (21 sq mi)

Population (2025-01-01)
  - Total: 236
  - Density: 4.4/km^{2} (11/sq mi)
- Time zone: UTC+1 (CET)
  - Summer (DST): UTC+2 (CEST)

Fresnedoso de Ibor is a municipality located in the province of Cáceres, Extremadura, Spain. According to the 2006 census (INE), the municipality has a population of 338 inhabitants.

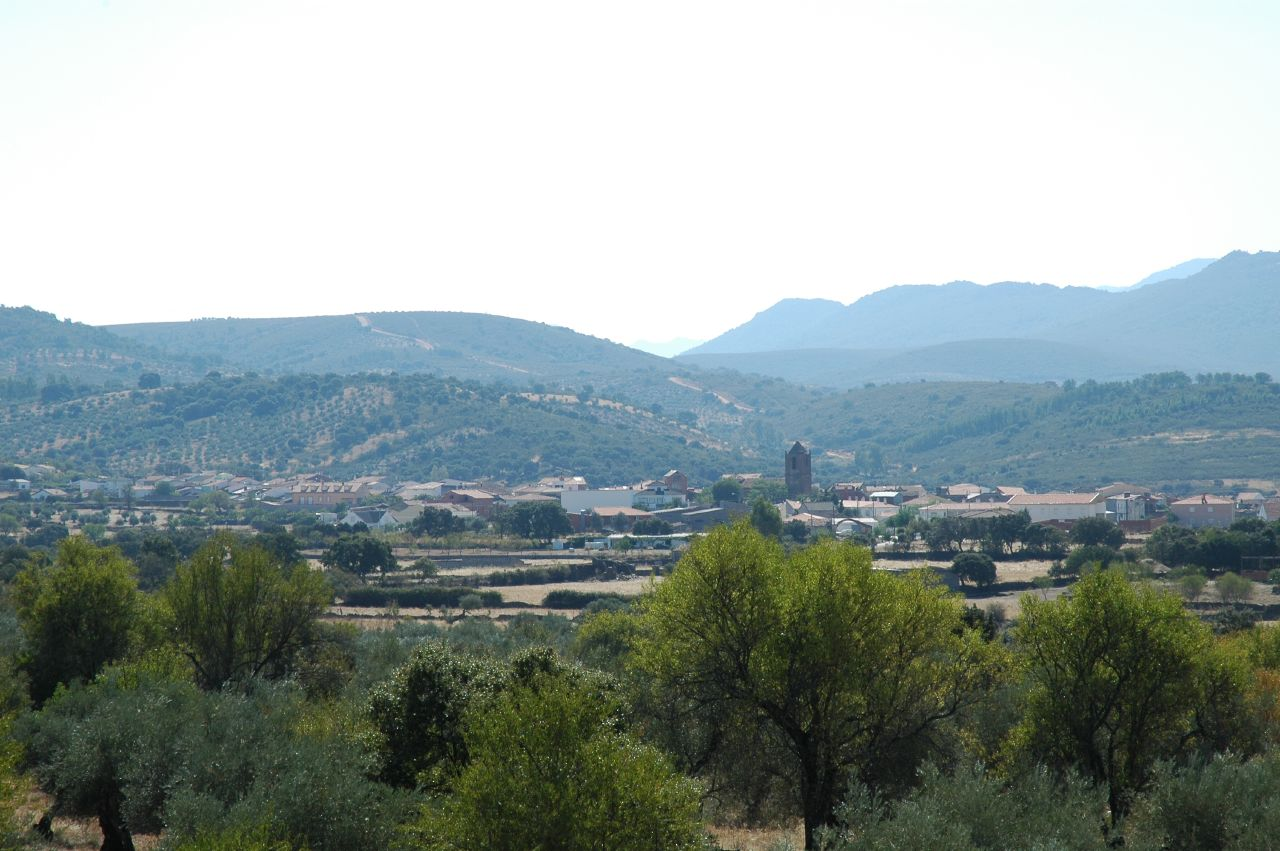
Fresnedoso de Ibor Town

== See also ==
- List of municipalities in Cáceres
