= Villasbuenas de Gata =

Coordinates: 40°10′N 6°37′W

Villasbuenas de Gata Villas-Güenas (Extremaduran)
- municipality
- Flag Coat of arms
- Interactive map of Villasbuenas de Gata
- Country: Spain
- Autonomous community: Extremadura
- Province: Cáceres
- Municipality: Villasbuenas de Gata

Area
  - Total: 47 km^{2} (18 sq mi)
- Elevation: 429 m (1,407 ft)

Population (2025-01-01)
  - Total: 481
  - Density: 10/km^{2} (27/sq mi)
- Time zone: UTC+1 (CET)
  - Summer (DST): UTC+2 (CEST)

Villasbuenas de Gata (Extremaduran: Villas-Güenas) is a municipality located in the province of Cáceres, Extremadura, Spain. According to the 2005 census (INE), the municipality has a population of 490 inhabitants.

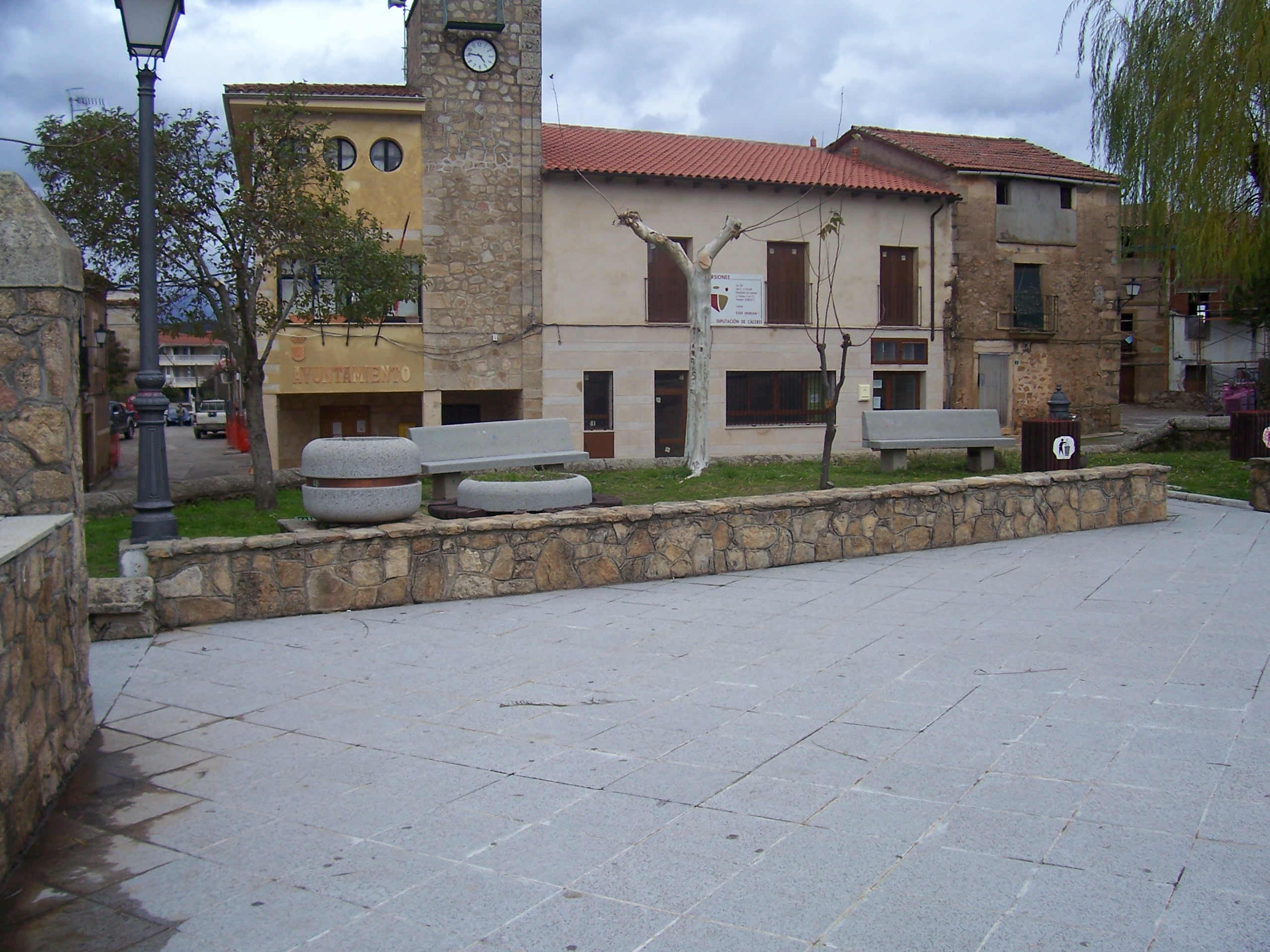
Palacio Square in Villasbuenas de Gata, Cáceres province, Spain

== See also ==
- List of municipalities in Cáceres
