= Riolobos =

Coordinates: 39°55′N 6°18′W

Riolobos, Spain
- municipality
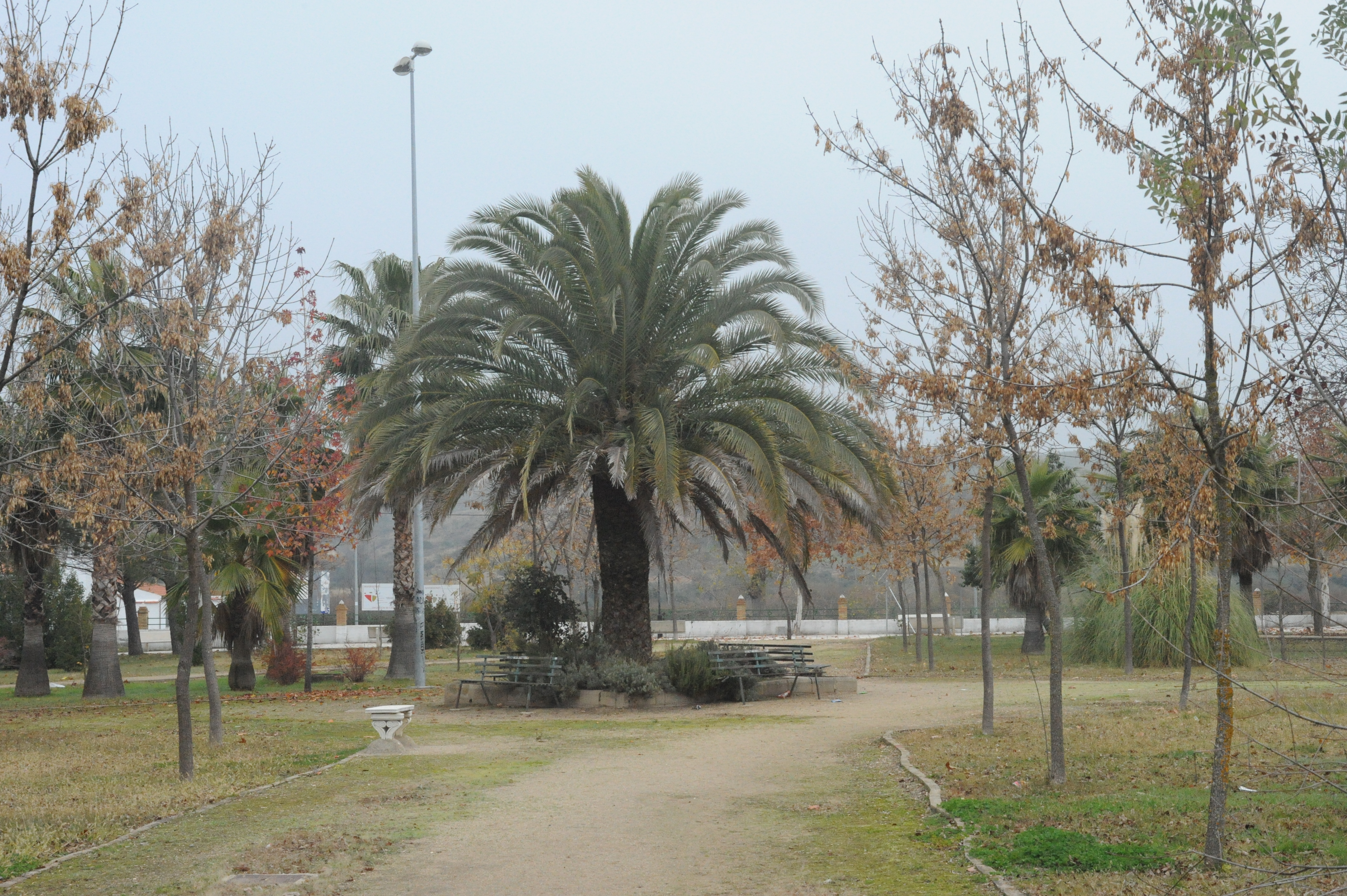
- Riolobos Botanical Garden, (Cáceres)

- Flag Coat of arms
- Interactive map of Riolobos, Spain
- Country: Spain
- Autonomous community: Extremadura
- Province: Cáceres
- Municipality: Riolobos

Area
  - Total: 49 km^{2} (19 sq mi)

Population (2025-01-01)
  - Total: 1,173
  - Density: 24/km^{2} (62/sq mi)
- Time zone: UTC+1 (CET)
  - Summer (DST): UTC+2 (CEST)

Riolobos (Spanish pronunciation: [rjoˈloβos]) is a municipality located in the province of Cáceres, Extremadura, Spain. According to the 2006 census (INE), the municipality has a population of 1268 inhabitants.

== See also ==
- List of municipalities in Cáceres
