= Morcillo =

Coordinates: 40°01′N 6°24′W

Morcillo, Spain
- municipality
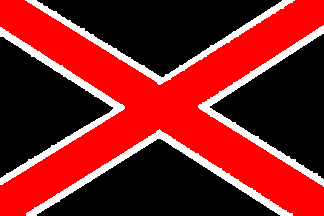
- Flag Coat of arms
- Interactive map of Morcillo, Spain
- Country: Spain
- Autonomous community: Extremadura
- Province: Cáceres
- Municipality: Morcillo

Area
  - Total: 16 km^{2} (6.2 sq mi)

Population (2025-01-01)
  - Total: 378
  - Density: 24/km^{2} (61/sq mi)
- Time zone: UTC+1 (CET)
  - Summer (DST): UTC+2 (CEST)

Morcillo is a municipality located in the province of Cáceres, Extremadura, Spain. According to the 2006 census (INE), the municipality has a population of 437 inhabitants.

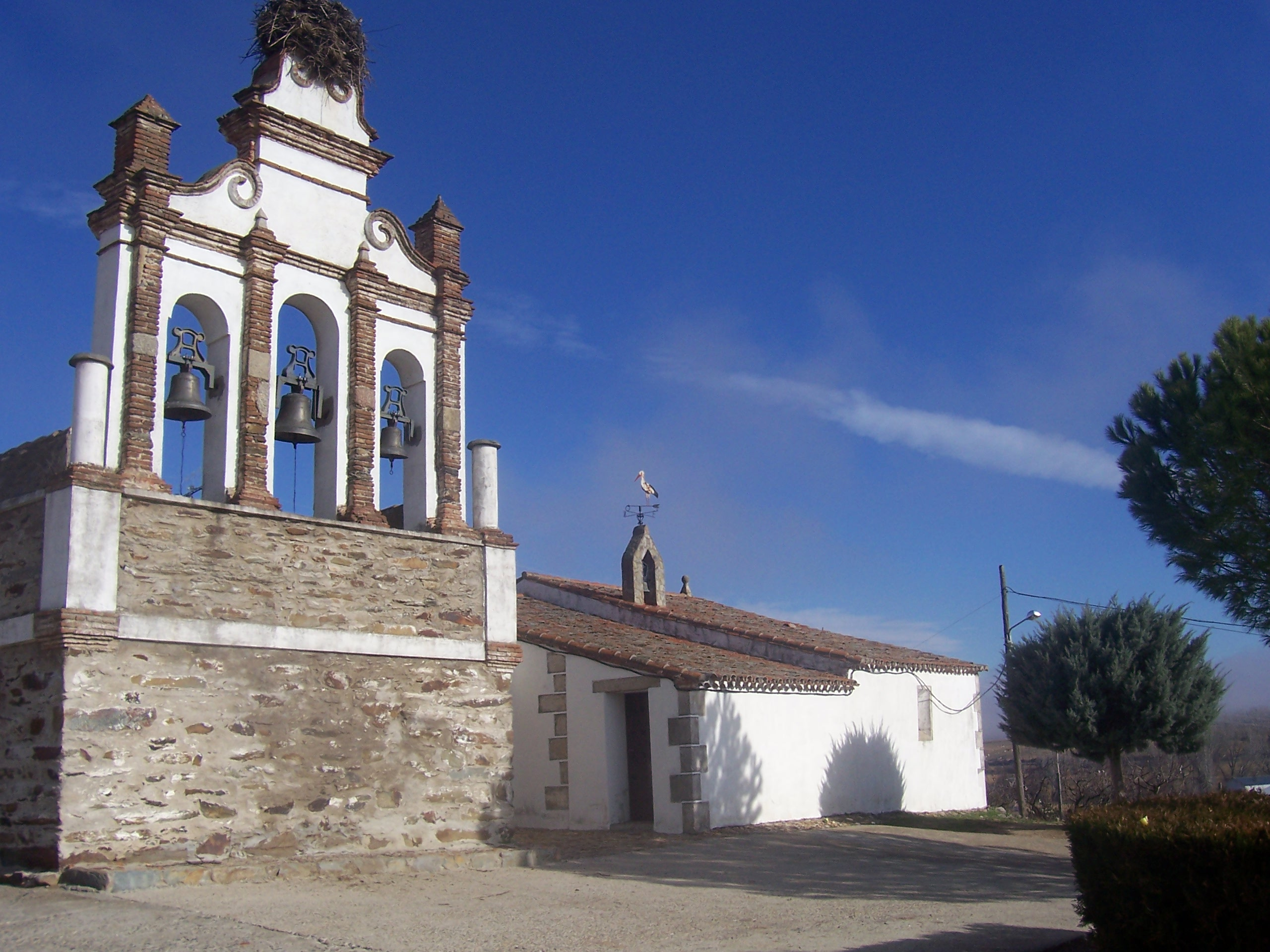
San Andrés Church in Morcillo, Cáceres province, Spain

== See also ==
- List of municipalities in Cáceres
