= Valdemorales =

Coordinates: 39°12′N 6°04′W

Valdemorales, Spain
- municipality
- Flag Coat of arms
- Interactive map of Valdemorales, Spain
- Country: Spain
- Autonomous community: Extremadura
- Province: Cáceres
- Municipality: Valdemorales

Area
  - Total: 9 km^{2} (3.5 sq mi)

Population (2025-01-01)
  - Total: 218
  - Density: 24/km^{2} (63/sq mi)
- Time zone: UTC+1 (CET)
  - Summer (DST): UTC+2 (CEST)

Valdemorales is a municipality located in the province of Cáceres, Extremadura, Spain. According to the 2006 census (INE), the municipality has a population of 242 inhabitants.

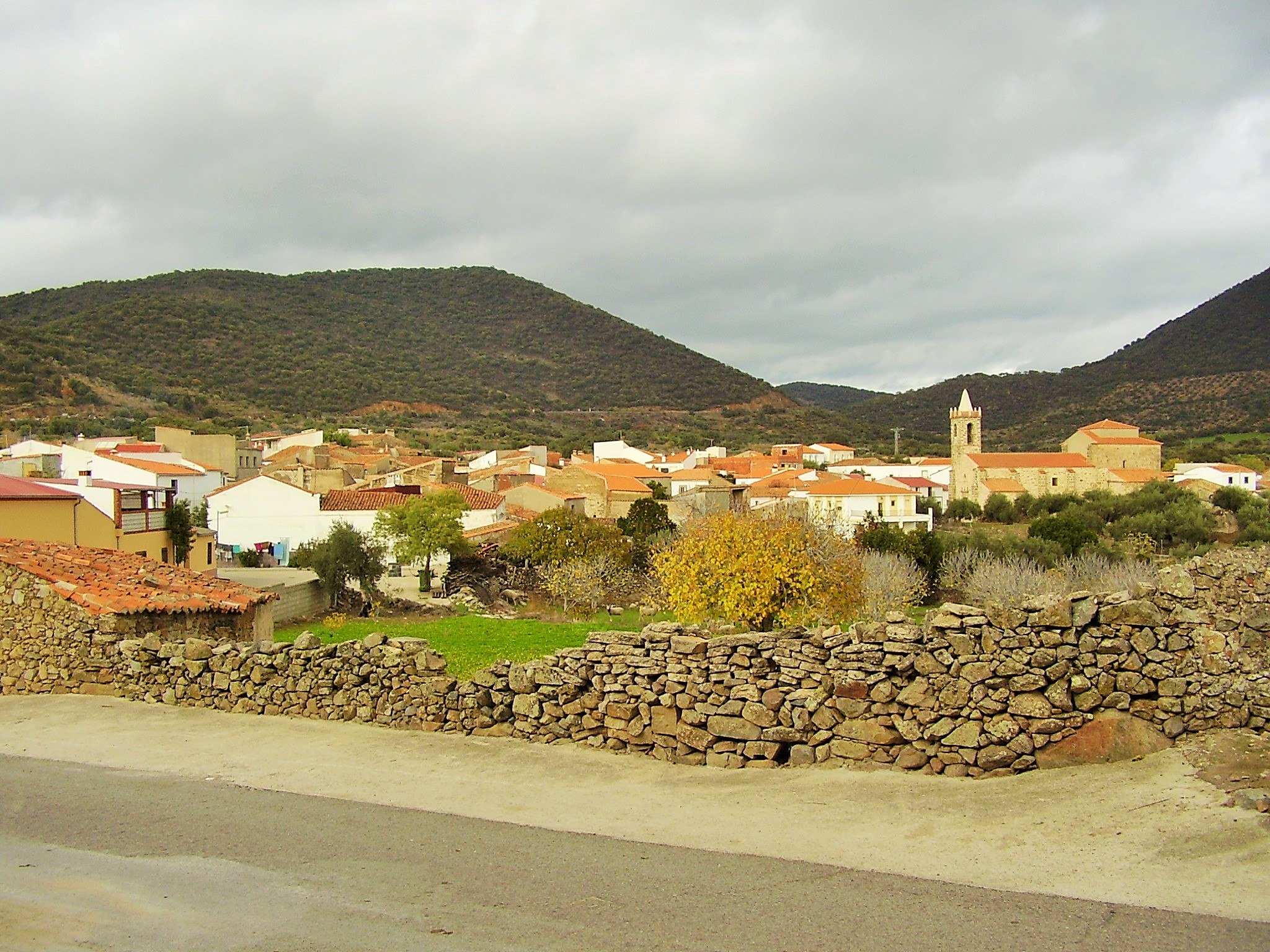
Panorama of Valdemorales, Cáceres, Spain

== See also ==
- List of municipalities in Cáceres
