= Torreorgaz =

Coordinates: 39°22′N 6°15′W

Torreorgaz, Spain
- municipality
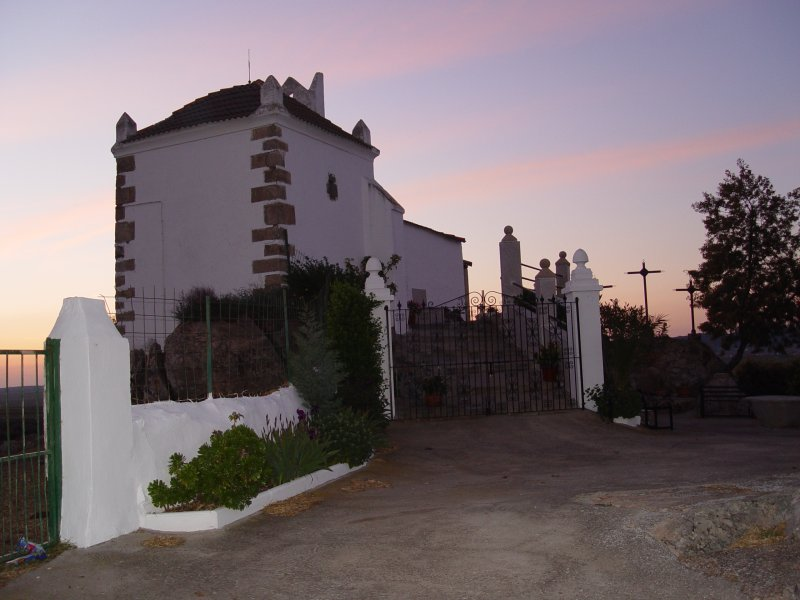
- Torreorgaz Calvario

- Coat of arms

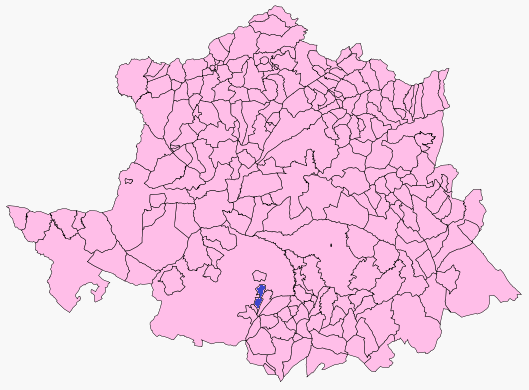
- Country: Spain
- Autonomous community: Extremadura
- Province: Cáceres
- Municipality: Torreorgaz

Area
  - Total: 31 km^{2} (12 sq mi)
- Elevation: 425 m (1,394 ft)

Population (2025-01-01)
  - Total: 1,641
  - Density: 53/km^{2} (140/sq mi)
- Time zone: UTC+1 (CET)
  - Summer (DST): UTC+2 (CEST)

Torreorgaz is a municipality in the province of Cáceres, Extremadura, Spain. According to the 2017 census (INE), the municipality has a population of 1669 inhabitants.

== See also ==
- List of municipalities in Cáceres
