= Navalvillar de Ibor =

Coordinates: 39°35′N 5°25′W

Navalvillar de Ibor Navavillal d'Ibol
- Coat of arms

- Location in Spain.
- Country: Spain
- Autonomous community: Cáceres

Area
  - Total: 54.54 km^{2} (21.06 sq mi)
- Elevation: 665 m (2,182 ft)

Population (2025-01-01)
  - Total: 374
  - Density: 6.86/km^{2} (17.8/sq mi)
- Time zone: UTC+1 (CET)
  - Summer (DST): UTC+2 (CEST)
- Website: www.navalvillardeibor.es

Navalvillar de Ibor (Extremaduran: Navavillal d'Ibol) is a municipality located in the province of Cáceres, in the autonomous community of Extremadura, Spain. The municipality covers an area of 54.5 square kilometres (21.0 sq mi) and as of 2011 had a population of 484 people.

== Physical geography ==
It is 120 kilometers from the capital, Cáceres, and is located in the valley of the Ibor River, being the first town that crosses it after its birth in the Sierra de Villuercas. It is located within the community of Villuercas-Ibores-Jara.

It borders Castañar de Ibor in the north, Guadalupe in the south, Navatrasierra in the east and Navezuelas in the west.

== Nature ==
The environment is characterized by the abundance of chestnut forest . There are also large areas of scrub and pastures with cork oaks and holm oaks, along with repopulations of conifers, olive trees and oaks. Likewise, the presence of the so-called "Loro" trees is remarkable, this tree being very scarce in the Iberian Peninsula.

Large mammals such as wild boar, deer, and roe deer, are among the most representative of the Navalvillar de Ibor Fauna and its surroundings.

== History ==
This area was early romanized, as several findings found in its territory indicate. After the reconquest of the area, these territories became part of the Talavera Lands for several centuries. At the fall of the Old Regime, the town became a constitutional municipality in the region of Extremadura. Since 1834 it has been integrated in the Judicial Party of Navalmoral de la Mata. In the 1842 census it had 40 homes and 219 residents.

=== Murder of Joaquin Franco Congregado ===
On July 12, 1916, Joaquin Franco Congregado, an agent of the Surveillance Service of Tenant Tobacco Company (Compañía Arrendataria de Tabacos) was fatally shot in the head by his partner, Cipriano Sanchez del Monte, while both were on a tour of duty searching out illegal tobacco crops and smuggling operations. The town's mayor, a judge, and a medic were immediately called to the site by Sanchez, who claimed that his supervisor, Franco, had been shot in an ambush. Becoming suspicious by the impossibility of an ambush due to the height and steepness of the mountain and the narrowness of the path, the officials had Sanchez re-enact the "ambush." Sanchez then changed his story, claiming he accidentally shot his partner. Franco died of his wound early the next morning. Sanchez's reconstruction of the "accident" that night, however, was refuted at his murder trial by arms experts who disputed that the trigger on his Smith & Wesson pistol would have accidentally fired in the way described and that, to the contrary, the wound trajectory indicated an aimed shot. After a sensational trial in 1917, Sanchez was sentenced to life imprisonment for the murder of Joaquin Franco Congregado. Sanchez was released in 1945 after serving 29 years.

== Demographics ==
According to the 2023 Spanish National Statistics Institute (Instituto Nacional de Estadisticas) Census, Navalvillar de Ibor has 383 residents.

The graphic depicts de jure and de facto population changes in Navalvillar de Ibor between 1842 and 2021 according to the INE Population Census.

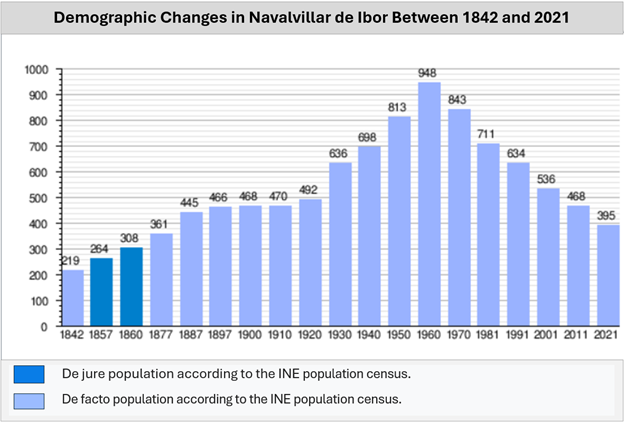

== Economy ==
=== Agriculture and livestock ===
The carved surface represents only 12.1%, highlighting the arable and olive groves. Livestock activity is more relevant, abundant goats, pigs and sheep.

== Culture ==
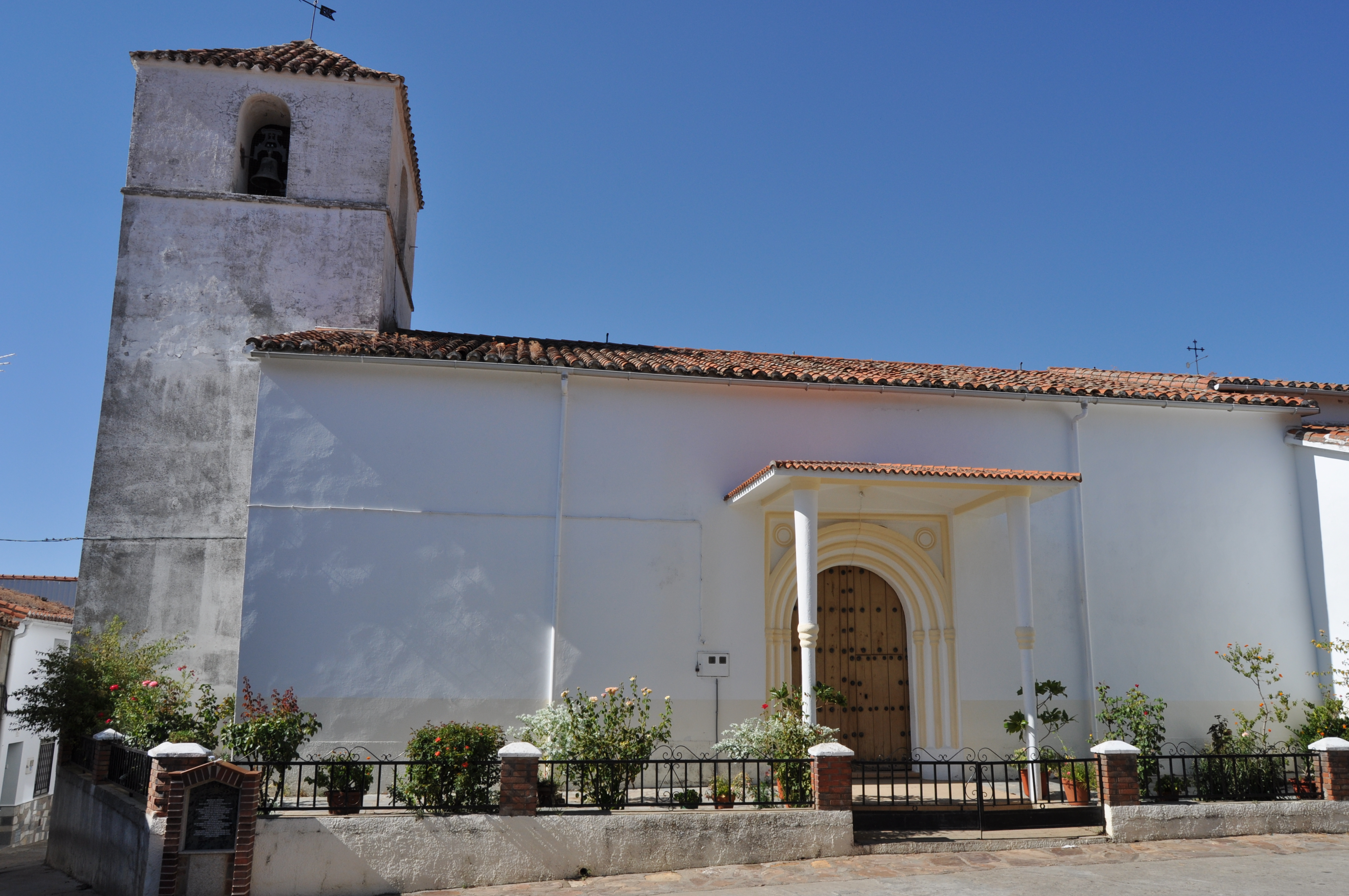
Church of Navalvilla de Ibor

=== Holidays ===
- "Dog Day" or Feast of the Fifths. It is celebrated the day after Carnival Tuesday.
- "Day of the Era". It consists of a family and picnic meal held during Easter Saturday.
- "The pasture" May 1. It is celebrated with special relevance in the municipality.
- Holy Scholastica, February 10. Patron of Navalvillar.
- San Isidro Labrador May 15. Party in honor of the farmers of Navalvillar de Ibor.
- San Roque. August 16. Navalvillar de Ibor pattern

=== Gastronomy ===
The municipality is located in the production area of Ibores Cheese.

For further information refer to the Spanish Wikipedia article Gastronomía de la provincia de Cáceres.

== See also ==
- Extremaduran language
- List of municipalities in Cáceres
