= Aceituna =

Coordinates: 40°09′N 6°20′W

- Municipality and town
- Flag Coat of arms

- Country: Spain
- Province: Vegas del Alagón
- Autonomous Community: Extremadura
- Provinces of Spain: Cáceres
- Region: Vegas del Alagón
- Commonwealth: Valle del Alagón
- Established: 13th century

Government
  - Mayor: Josafat Clemente Pérez

Area
  - Land: 40.08 km^{2} (15.47 sq mi)

Population (2025-01-01)
  - Total: 569
  - Density: 15.5/km^{2} (40/sq mi)
- Postcode: 10666
- Area code: 927-431
- Website: http://www.aceituna.es/

Location of Aceituna in Spain

Aceituna is a municipality in the province of Cáceres and autonomous community of Extremadura, Spain. The municipality covers an area of 620 square kilometres (240 sq mi) and as of 2011 had a population of 620 people.

== History ==
Aceituna was founded in the 13th century as a village in the Galisteo Lordship. Aceituna was emancipated as a municipality in 1837, along with the rest of the peoples of the lordship.

At the fall of the Ancien Régime the area was constituted into a constitutional municipality in the region of Extremadura, judicial district of Granadilla, then known as Aceytuna. In the census of 1842 it had 110 homes and 603 residents.

== Gastronomy ==
Aceituna's cuisine is based on the products of the earth and the weather. During slaughter time kiko sausages and liendrillas are made. Also typical during the summer are gazpacho and zorongollo. At weddings and celebrations honey and sugar donuts, fried bagels, honey flowers and buns are usually offered. On the day of the pilgrimage of Christ roses dipped in sugar are distributed.

== Local celebrations ==
In Aceituna the following local feasts are celebrated:

- Feast of San Sebastián on the 20, 21 and 22 of January.
- Carnivals.
- Semana Santa (Holy Week).
- Pilgrimage, seven days after Easter Sunday.
- San Antonio, on June 13.
- Feast of Santa Marina on July 18.
- Offertory, first Sunday after September 8.

== Demography ==
Demographic evolution
1787	1827	1850	1920	1950	1981	2001	2002	2003	2004	2005	2006
344	350	603	602	772	803	701	657	663	645	632	618

== Hydrography ==
All Aceituna's waters flow into the Alagon river, which marks the boundary between the municipal districts of Aceituna and Valdeobispo. The most important streams that pass through the town of Aceituna are the Aceituna Streams and the Higaleja and Ribera del Bronco Streams.

To the south of the municipality is the San Marcos dam, in the Aceituna stream. The other town reservoir is the Valdeobispo reservoir, on the border with Valdeobispo.

At the end there are also several lakes, such as Lake Maruguero, the Laguna Nueva, the Manzano Lagoon, the Chavarcón Lagoon, the Chica Lagoon, the Tejares Lagoon, etc.

== See also ==
- List of municipalities in Cáceres
