= Valdeobispo =

- Flag Coat of arms

- Location in Spain
- Coordinates: 40°5′N 6°15′W
- Country: Spain
- Autonomous community: Extremadura
- Province: Cáceres
- Municipality: Valdeobispo

Area
  - Total: 42 km^{2} (16 sq mi)

Population (2025-01-01)
  - Total: 617
- Time zone: UTC+1 (CET)
  - Summer (DST): UTC+2 (CEST)
- Website: www.valdeobispo.net (unofficial)

Valdeobispo is a municipality located in the province of Cáceres, in the autonomous community of Extremadura, Spain. According to the 2014 census, the municipality has a population of 705 inhabitants.

== See also ==
- List of municipalities in Cáceres
