= Villa del Campo, Cáceres =

Villa del Campo, Spain
- municipality
- Flag Coat of arms
- Interactive map of Villa del Campo, Spain
- Coordinates: 40°08′N 06°24′W
- Country: Spain
- Autonomous community: Extremadura
- Province: Cáceres
- Municipality: Villa del Campo

Area
  - Total: 57 km^{2} (22 sq mi)
- Elevation: 473 m (1,552 ft)

Population (2025-01-01)
  - Total: 435
  - Density: 7.6/km^{2} (20/sq mi)
- Time zone: UTC+1 (CET)
  - Summer (DST): UTC+2 (CEST)

Villa del Campo (Extremaduran: Villa el Campu) is a municipality located in the province of Cáceres, Extremadura, Spain. According to the 2006 census (INE), the municipality had a population of 581 inhabitants.

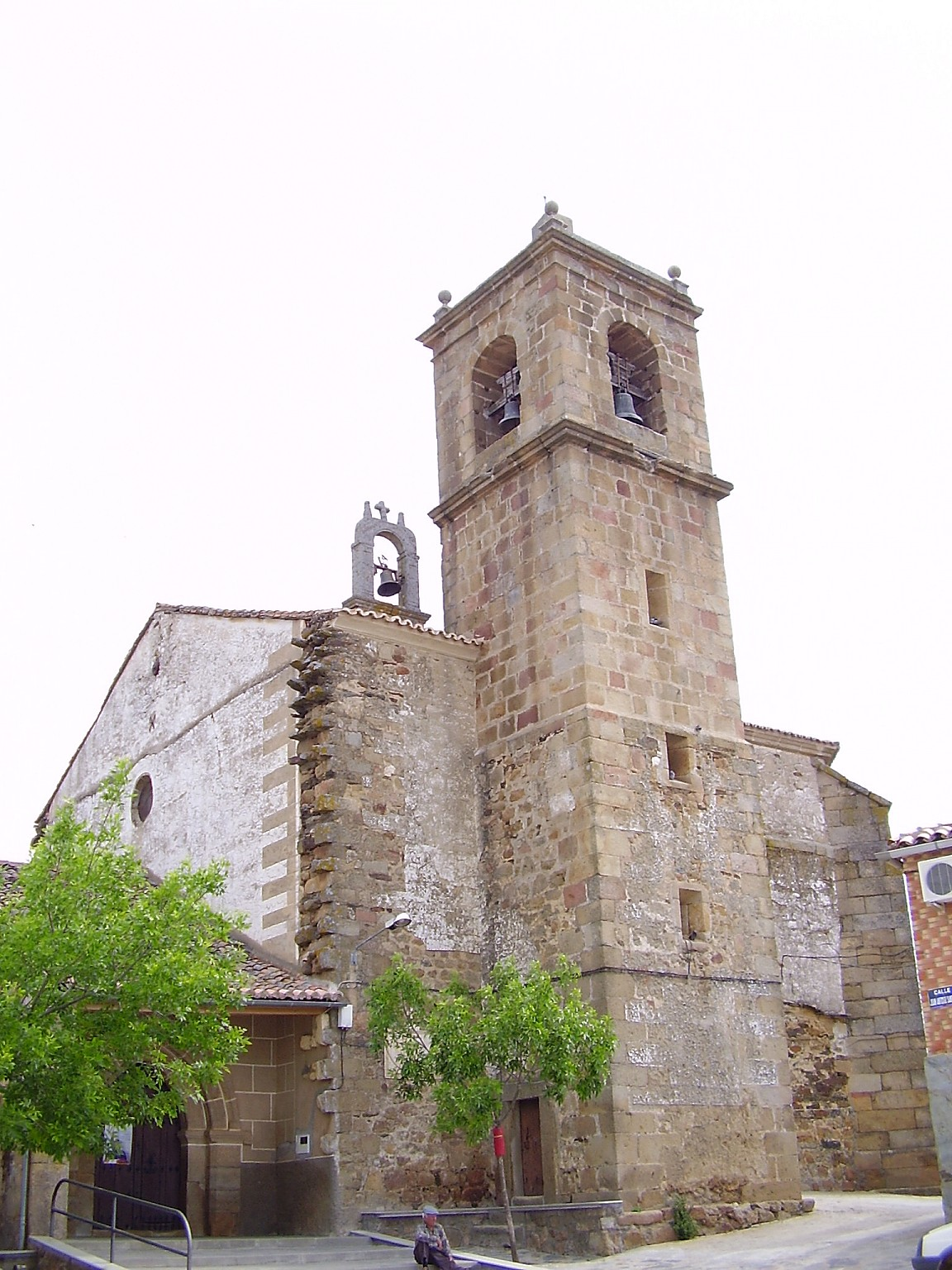
Villa del Campo Church

== See also ==
- List of municipalities in Cáceres
