= Cadalso =

Village in Extremadura, Spain

Cadalso, Spain
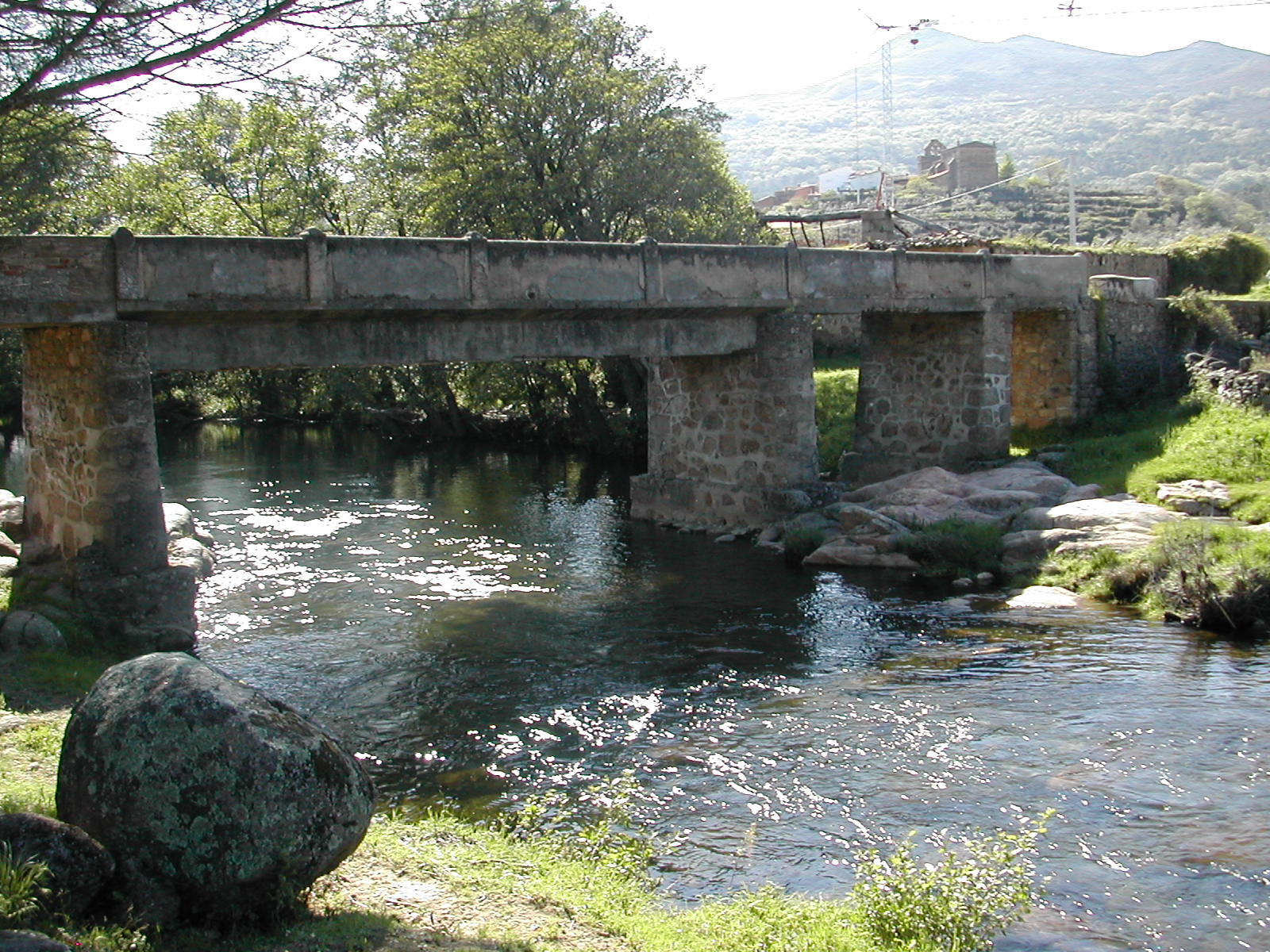

- Flag Coat of arms
- Interactive map of Cadalso, Spain
- Coordinates: 40°14′N 6°32′W
- Country: Spain
- Autonomous community: Extremadura
- Province: Cáceres
- Municipality: Cadalso

Area
  - Total: 7 km^{2} (2.7 sq mi)
- Elevation: 438 m (1,437 ft)

Population (2025-01-01)
  - Total: 394
  - Density: 56/km^{2} (150/sq mi)
- Time zone: UTC+1 (CET)
  - Summer (DST): UTC+2 (CEST)

Cadalso is a small village in the west of Spain, near Portugal. It is situated on the Sierra de Gata in Northwest of province of Cáceres, autonomous community of Extremadura. Its population in 2003 was 581. The major livelihoods of the area consist of agriculture, olive oil, goats and pines.

== See also ==
- List of municipalities in Cáceres
