= Pozuelo de Zarzón =

Pozuelo de Zarzón, Spain
- municipality
- Coat of arms
- Interactive map of Pozuelo de Zarzón, Spain
- Coordinates: 40°08′N 06°24′W
- Country: Spain
- Autonomous community: Extremadura
- Province: Cáceres
- Municipality: Pozuelo de Zarzón

Area
  - Total: 47 km^{2} (18 sq mi)
- Elevation: 466 m (1,529 ft)

Population (2025-01-01)
  - Total: 430
  - Density: 9.1/km^{2} (24/sq mi)
- Time zone: UTC+1 (CET)
  - Summer (DST): UTC+2 (CEST)

Pozuelo de Zarzón (Extremaduran: Poçuelu Çarçón) is a municipality located in the province of Cáceres, Extremadura, Spain. According to the 2006 census (INE), the municipality has a population of 564 inhabitants.

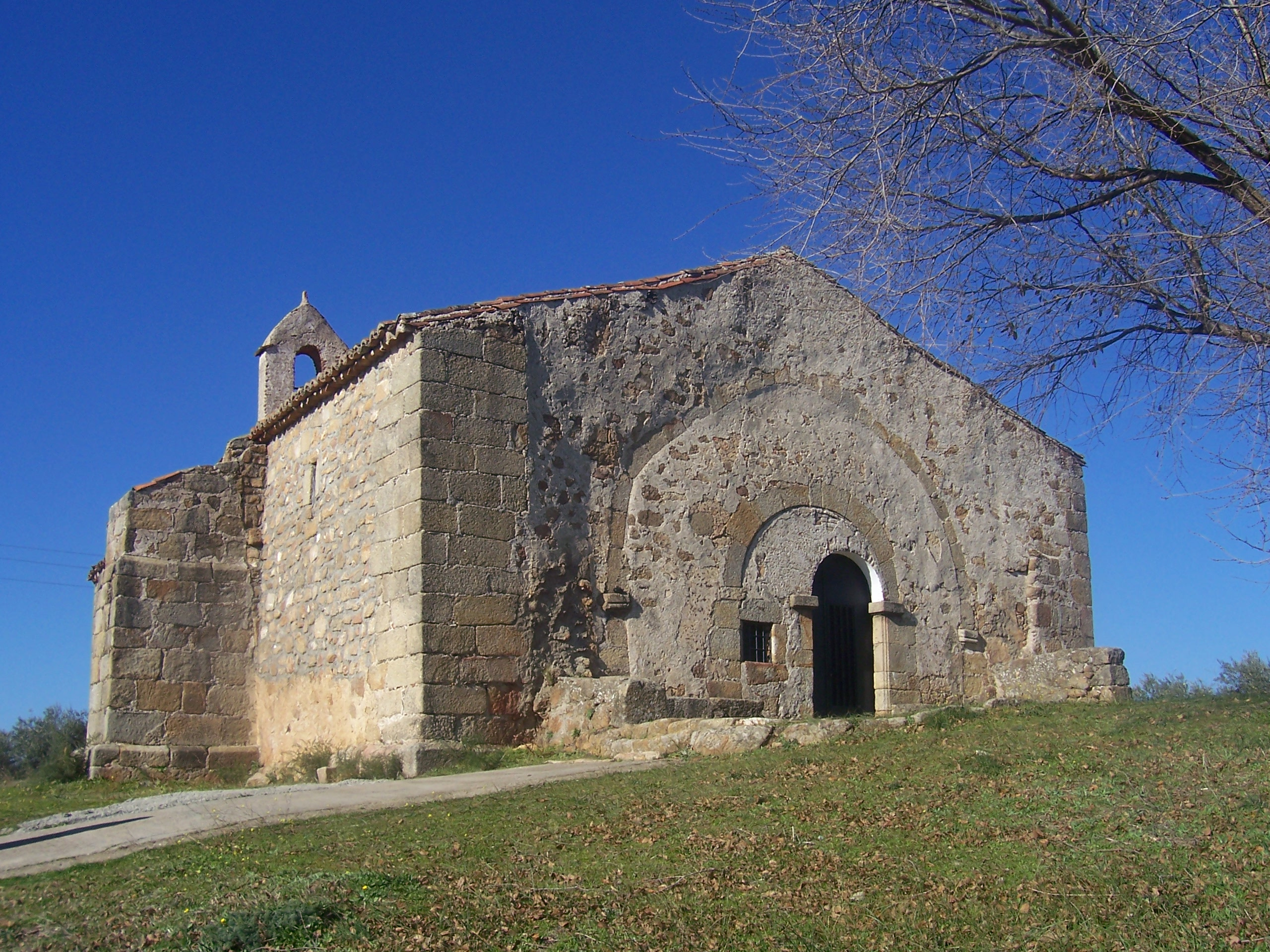
Hermitage of San José in Pozuelo de Zarzón, Cáceres, Spain

== See also ==
- List of municipalities in Cáceres
