= Herreruela =

Coordinates: 39°28′N 6°54′W

Herreruela, Spain
- municipality
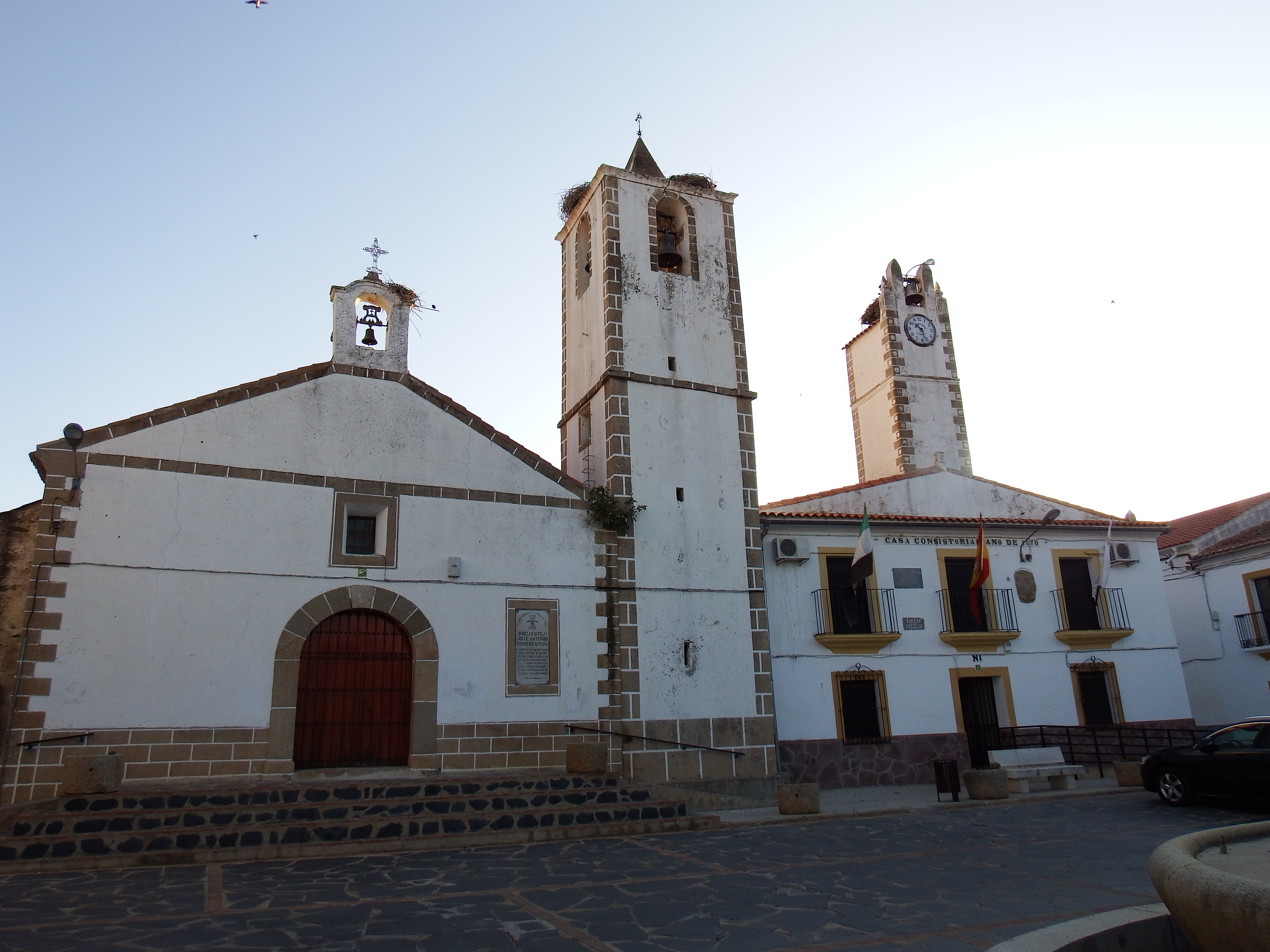
- Church and Town hall of Herreruela

- Flag Coat of arms
- Interactive map of Herreruela, Spain
- Country: Spain
- Autonomous community: Extremadura
- Province: Cáceres
- Municipality: Herreruela

Area
  - Total: 113 km^{2} (44 sq mi)

Population (2025-01-01)
  - Total: 322
  - Density: 2.85/km^{2} (7.38/sq mi)
- Time zone: UTC+1 (CET)
  - Summer (DST): UTC+2 (CEST)

Herreruela is a municipality located in the province of Cáceres, Extremadura, Spain. According to the 2006 census (INE), the municipality has a population of 397 inhabitants.

== See also ==
- List of municipalities in Cáceres
