= Villamiel =

Villamiel, Spain
- municipality
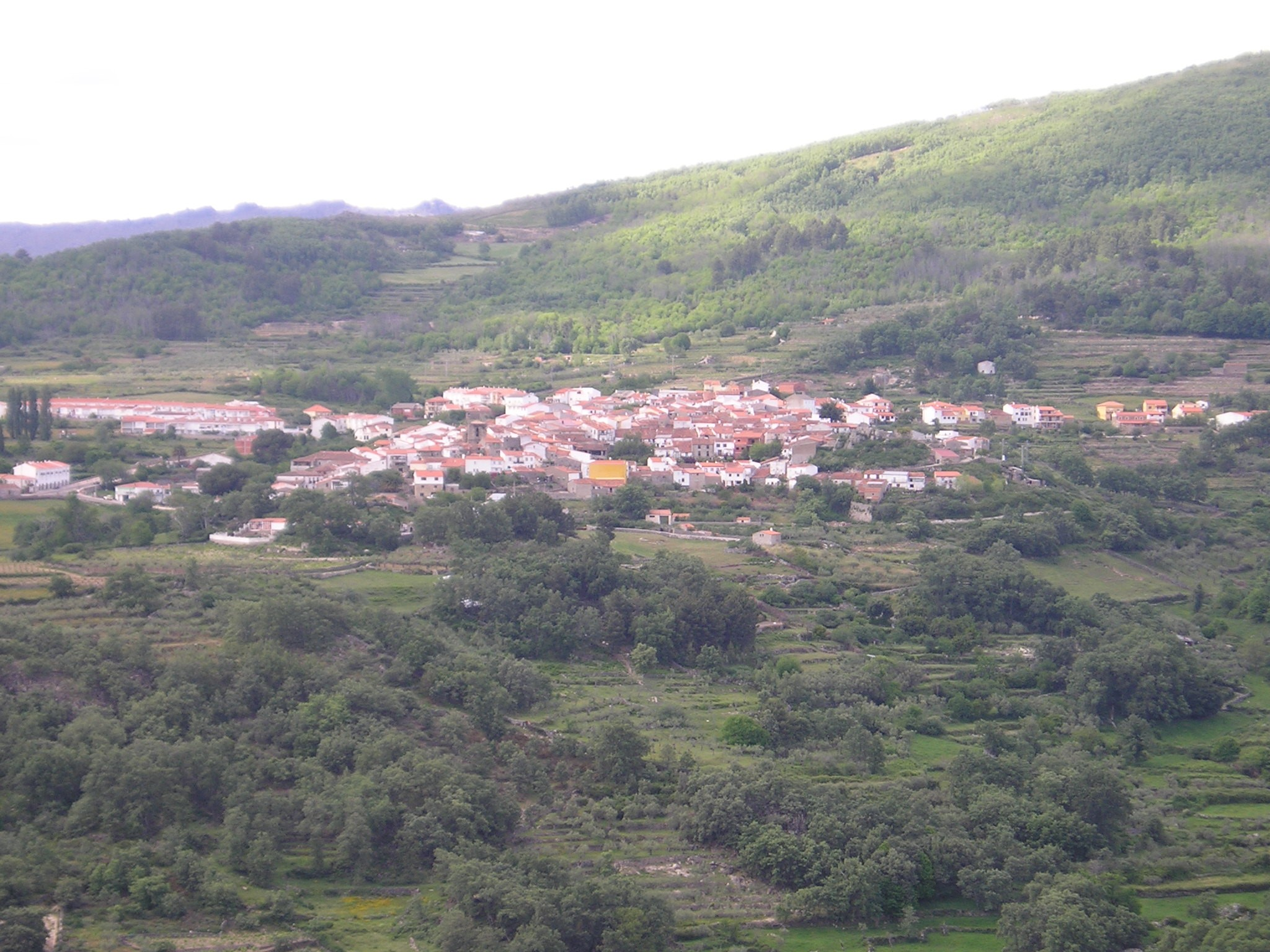
- Panoramic view Villamiel.

- Flag Coat of arms
- Interactive map of Villamiel, Spain
- Coordinates: 40°11′14″N 6°47′05″W
- Country: Spain
- Autonomous community: Extremadura
- Province: Cáceres
- Municipality: Villamiel

Area
  - Total: 73 km^{2} (28 sq mi)
- Elevation: 744 m (2,441 ft)

Population (2025-01-01)
  - Total: 379
  - Density: 5.2/km^{2} (13/sq mi)
- Time zone: UTC+1 (CET)
  - Summer (DST): UTC+2 (CEST)

Villamiel (Fala: Vilamel) is a municipality located in the province of Cáceres, Extremadura, Spain. According to the 2005 census (INE), the municipality has a population of 758 inhabitants.

== See also ==
- List of municipalities in Cáceres
