= Garciaz =

Coordinates: 39°25′N 5°37′W

Garciaz, Spain
- municipality
- Coat of arms
- Interactive map of Garciaz, Spain
- Country: Spain
- Autonomous community: Extremadura
- Province: Cáceres
- Municipality: Garciaz

Area
  - Total: 150.28 km^{2} (58.02 sq mi)
- Elevation: 650 m (2,130 ft)

Population (2025-01-01)
  - Total: 666
  - Density: 4.43/km^{2} (11.5/sq mi)
- Time zone: UTC+1 (CET)
  - Summer (DST): UTC+2 (CEST)

Garciaz is a municipality located in the province of Cáceres, Extremadura, Spain. According to the 2006 census (INE), the municipality has a population of 902 inhabitants.

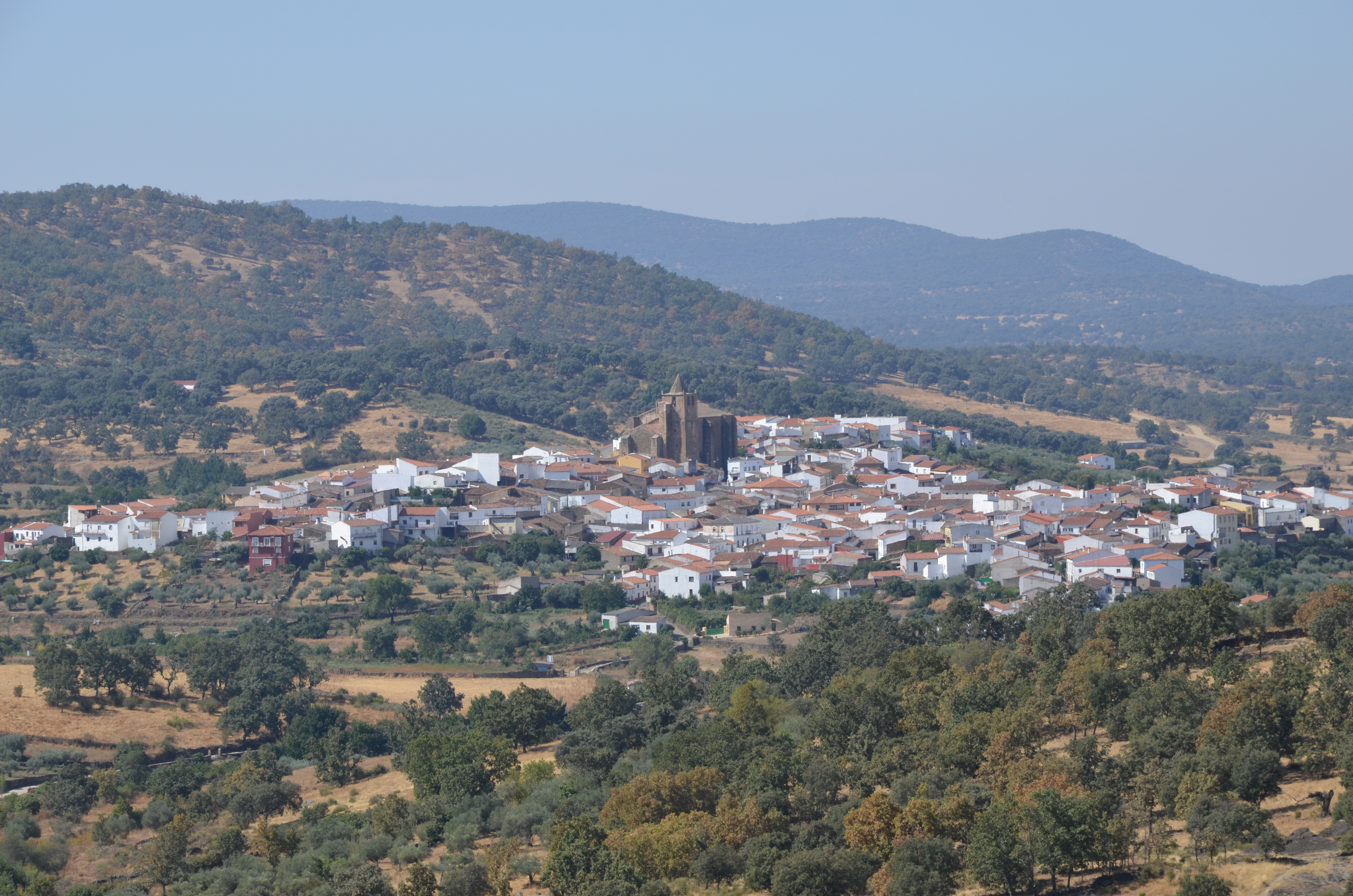
View of Garciaz

== See also ==
- List of municipalities in Cáceres
