= Barrado =

Coordinates: 40°05′N 5°53′W

Barrado, Spain
- Coat of arms
- Interactive map of Barrado, Spain
- Country: Spain
- Autonomous community: Extremadura
- Province: Cáceres
- Municipality: Barrado

Area
  - Total: 19 km^{2} (7.3 sq mi)

Population (2025-01-01)
  - Total: 383
  - Density: 20/km^{2} (52/sq mi)
- Time zone: UTC+1 (CET)
  - Summer (DST): UTC+2 (CEST)

Barrado is a municipality located in the province of Cáceres, Extremadura, Spain. According to the 2005 census (INE), the municipality has a population of 507 inhabitants.

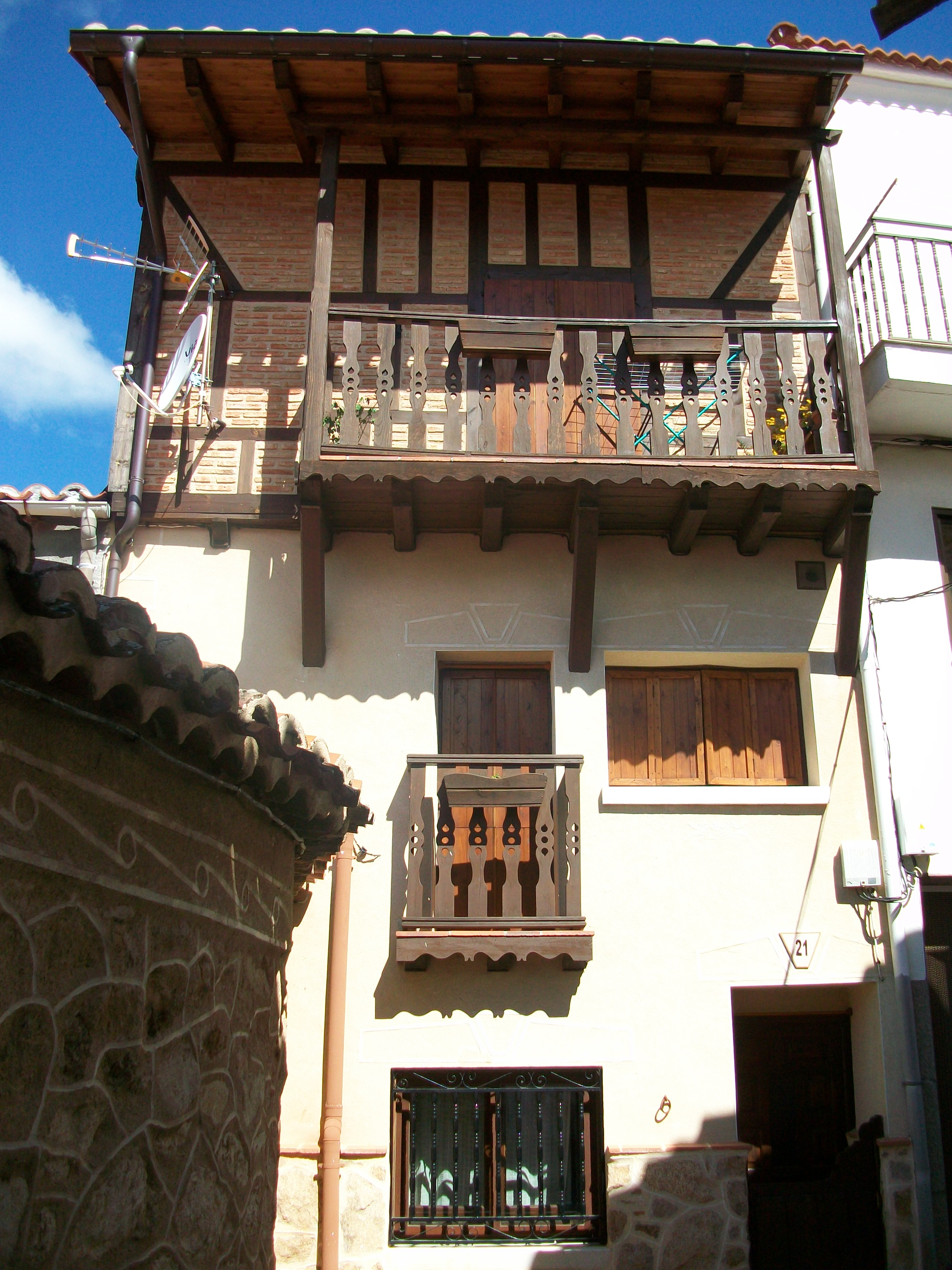
Typical house of Barrado.

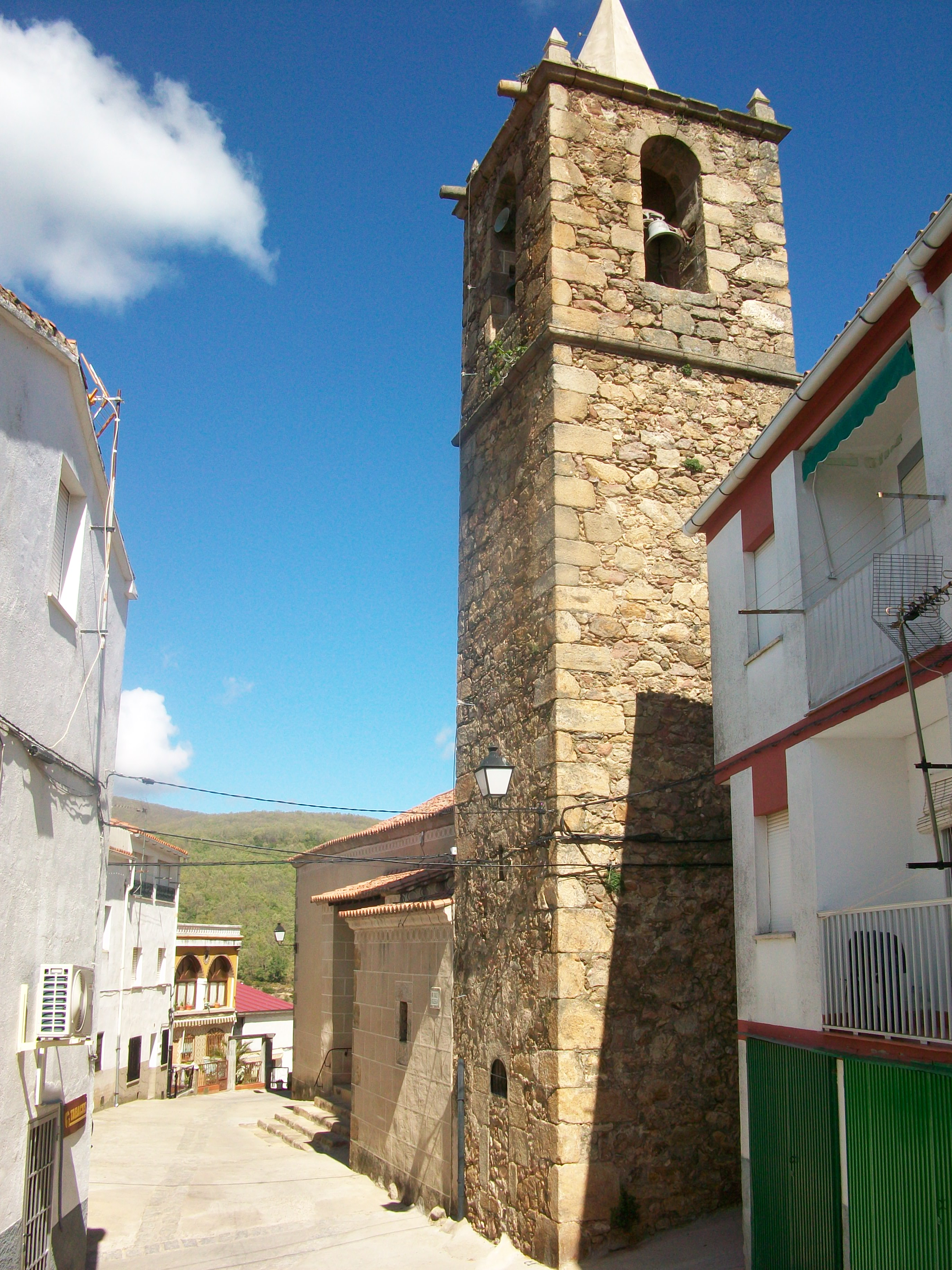
Iglesia parroquial de San Sebastián.

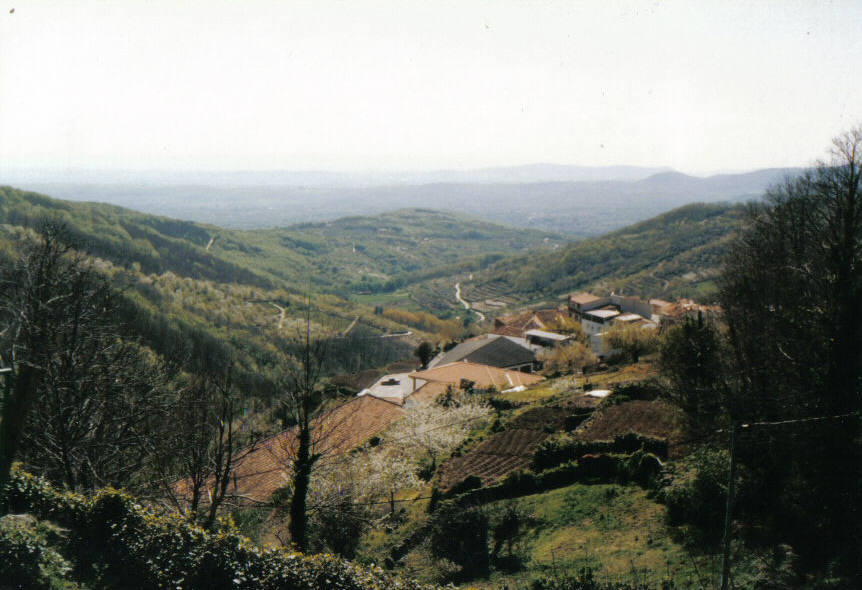
View of Barrado.

== See also ==
- List of municipalities in Cáceres
