= Portaje =

Coordinates: 39°55′N 6°33′W

Portaje, Spain
- municipality
- Flag Coat of arms
- Interactive map of Portaje, Spain
- Country: Spain
- Autonomous community: Extremadura
- Province: Cáceres
- Municipality: Portaje

Area
  - Total: 100 km^{2} (39 sq mi)

Population (2025-01-01)
  - Total: 379
  - Density: 3.8/km^{2} (9.8/sq mi)
- Time zone: UTC+1 (CET)
  - Summer (DST): UTC+2 (CEST)

Portaje is a municipality located in the province of Cáceres, Extremadura, Spain. According to the 2006 census (INE), the municipality has a population of 398 inhabitants.

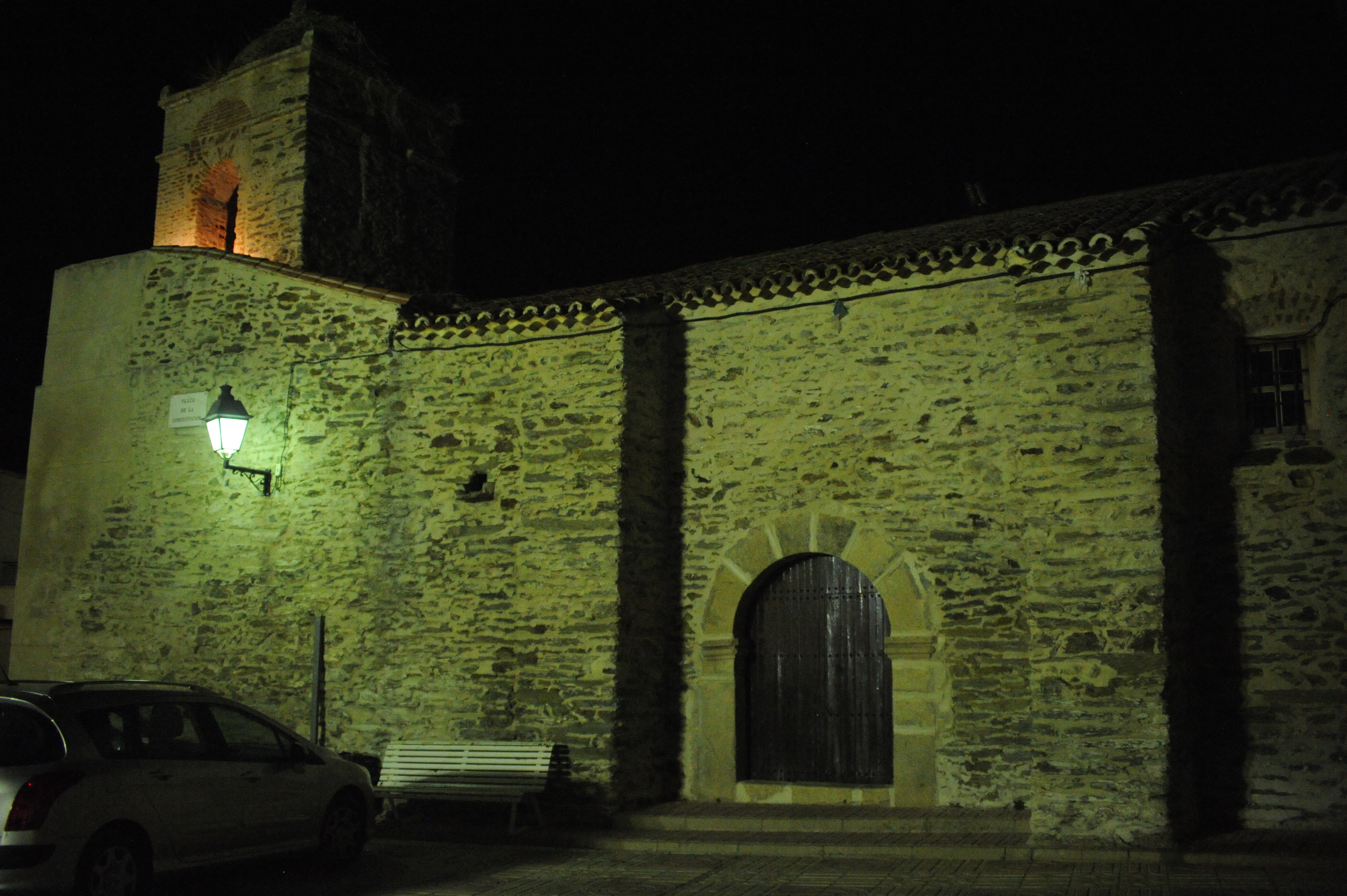
The Portaje Church at Night

== See also ==
- List of municipalities in Cáceres
