= Membrío =

Coordinates: 39°32′N 7°03′W

Membrío, Spain
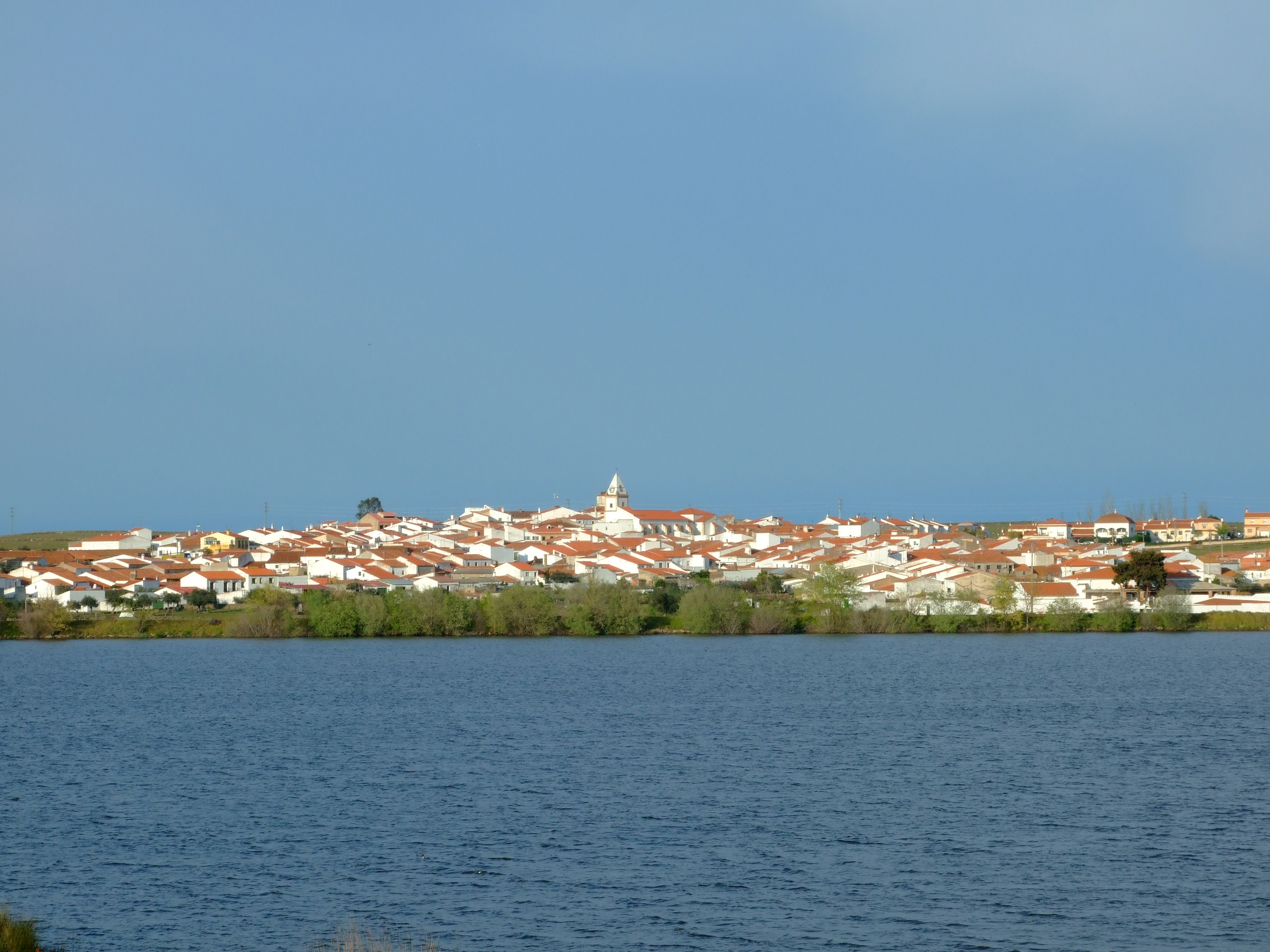

- Coat of arms

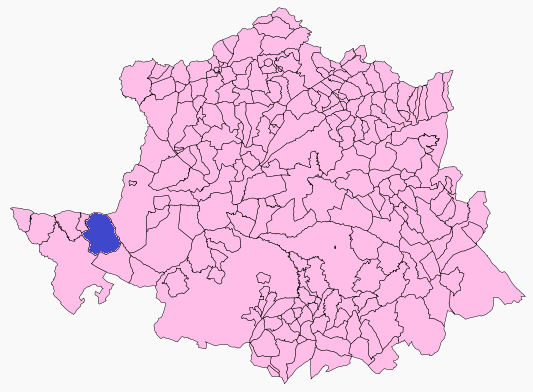
- Country: Spain
- Autonomous community: Extremadura
- Province: Cáceres
- Municipality: Membrío

Area
  - Total: 207 km^{2} (80 sq mi)

Population (2024)
  - Total: 572
  - Density: 2.76/km^{2} (7.16/sq mi)
- Time zone: UTC+1 (CET)
  - Summer (DST): UTC+2 (CEST)

Membrío (pronounced [memˈbɾi.o]) is a municipality located in the province of Cáceres in Extremadura, Spain. According to the 2024 census, the municipality had a population of 572.

Membrío is located approximately 67 kilometers from the town of Cáceres, and about 40 kilometers from the Portuguese border.

The town of Membrío itself was first settled in the early 13th century by the Order of Alcántara.

== See also ==
- List of municipalities in Cáceres
