= Torre de Santa María =

Coordinates: 39.25°N 6.1°W

- Coat of arms

- Location in Spain.
- Country: Spain
- Autonomous community: Cáceres

Area
  - Total: 19.07 km^{2} (7.36 sq mi)
- Elevation: 490 m (1,610 ft)

Population (2025-01-01)
  - Total: 508
  - Density: 26.6/km^{2} (69.0/sq mi)
- Time zone: UTC+1 (CET)
  - Summer (DST): UTC+2 (CEST)
- Website: www.torredesantamaria.es

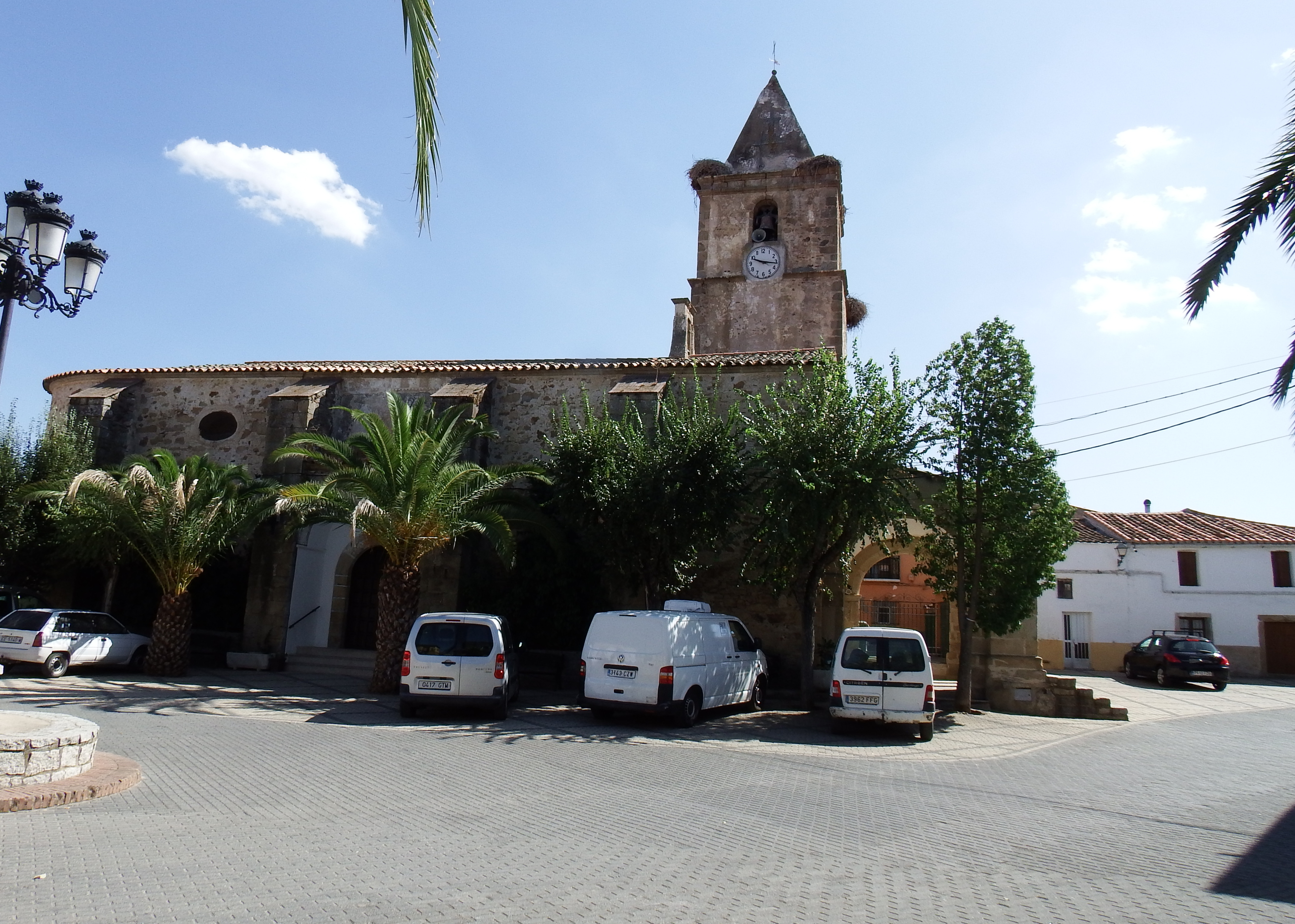
Torre de Santa María Main Square

Torre de Santa María is a municipality located in the province of Cáceres and autonomous community of Extremadura, Spain. The municipality covers an area of 19.07 square kilometres (7.36 sq mi) and as of 2011 had a population of 642 people.

== See also ==
- List of municipalities in Cáceres
