= Cachorrilla =

Cachorrilla, Spain
- municipality
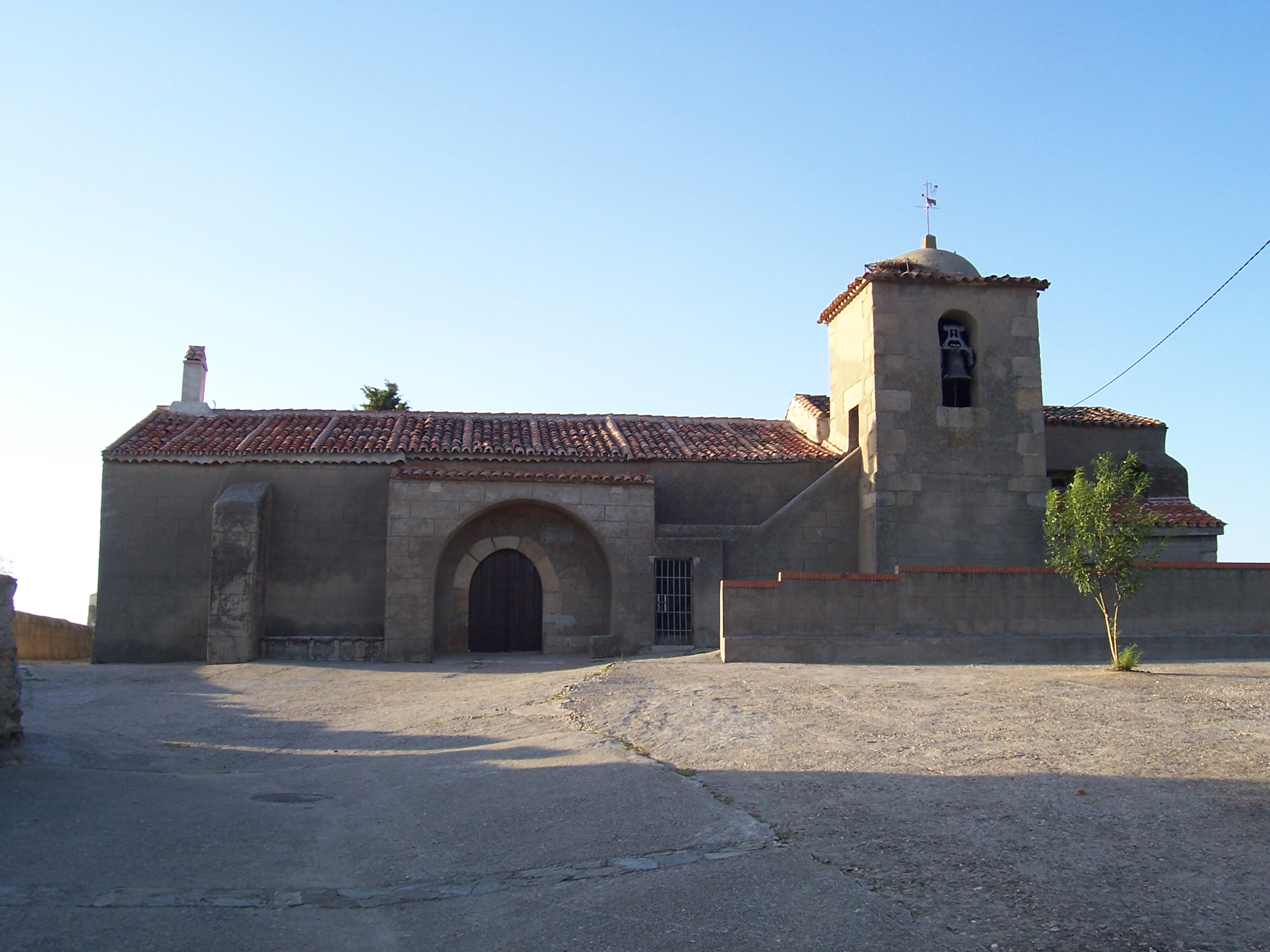

- Flag Coat of arms
- Interactive map of Cachorrilla, Spain
- Coordinates: 39°54′56″N 6°40′09″W
- Country: Spain
- Autonomous community: Extremadura
- Province: Cáceres
- Municipality: Cachorrilla

Area
  - Total: 41 km^{2} (16 sq mi)

Population (2025-01-01)
  - Total: 83
  - Density: 2.0/km^{2} (5.2/sq mi)
- Time zone: UTC+1 (CET)
  - Summer (DST): UTC+2 (CEST)
- Website: http://www.cachorrilla.com

Cachorrilla is a municipality located in the province of Cáceres, Extremadura, Spain. According to the 2006 census (INE), the municipality has a population of 88 inhabitants.

== See also ==
- List of municipalities in Cáceres
