= Garvín de la Jara =

Coordinates: 39°43′N 5°21′W

Garvín de la Jara, Spain
- municipality
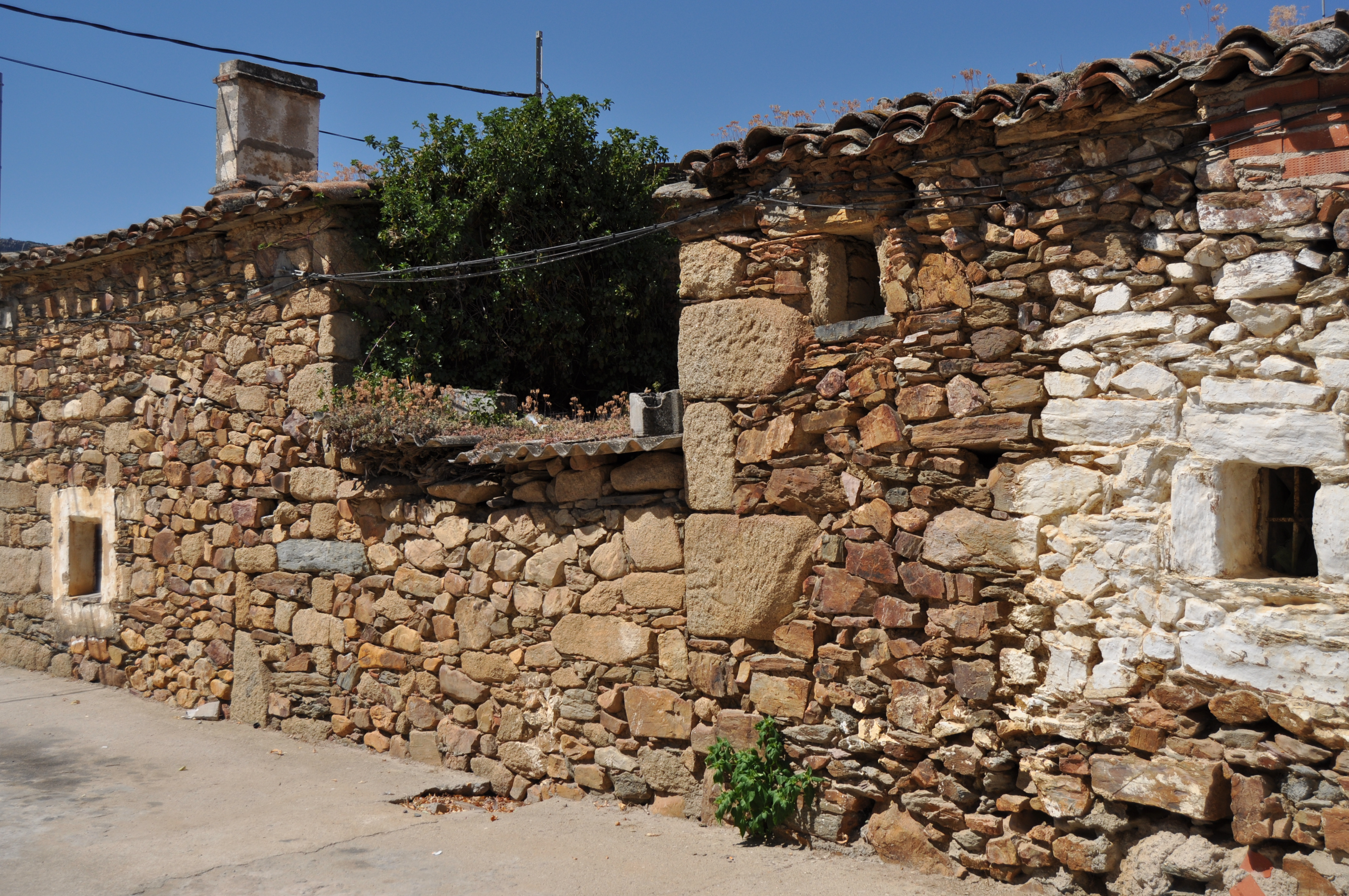

- Coat of arms
- Interactive map of Garvín de la Jara, Spain
- Country: Spain
- Autonomous community: Extremadura
- Province: Cáceres
- Municipality: Garvín

Area
  - Total: 38 km^{2} (15 sq mi)

Population (2025-01-01)
  - Total: 101
  - Density: 2.7/km^{2} (6.9/sq mi)
- Time zone: UTC+1 (CET)
  - Summer (DST): UTC+2 (CEST)

Garvín de la Jara (Spanish pronunciation: [ɡaɾˈβin de la ˈxaɾa]) is a municipality located in the province of Cáceres, Extremadura, Spain. According to the 2006 census (INE), the municipality has a population of 109 inhabitants.

== See also ==
- List of municipalities in Cáceres
