= Puerto de Santa Cruz =

Coordinates: 39°19′N 5°51′W

Puerto de Santa Cruz, Spain
- municipality
- Coat of arms
- Interactive map of Puerto de Santa Cruz, Spain
- Country: Spain
- Autonomous community: Extremadura
- Province: Cáceres
- Municipality: Puerto de Santa Cruz

Area
  - Total: 33 km^{2} (13 sq mi)

Population (2025-01-01)
  - Total: 268
  - Density: 8.1/km^{2} (21/sq mi)
- Time zone: UTC+1 (CET)
  - Summer (DST): UTC+2 (CEST)

Puerto de Santa Cruz is a municipality located in the province of Cáceres, Extremadura, Spain. According to the 2006 census (INE), the municipality has a population of 403 inhabitants.

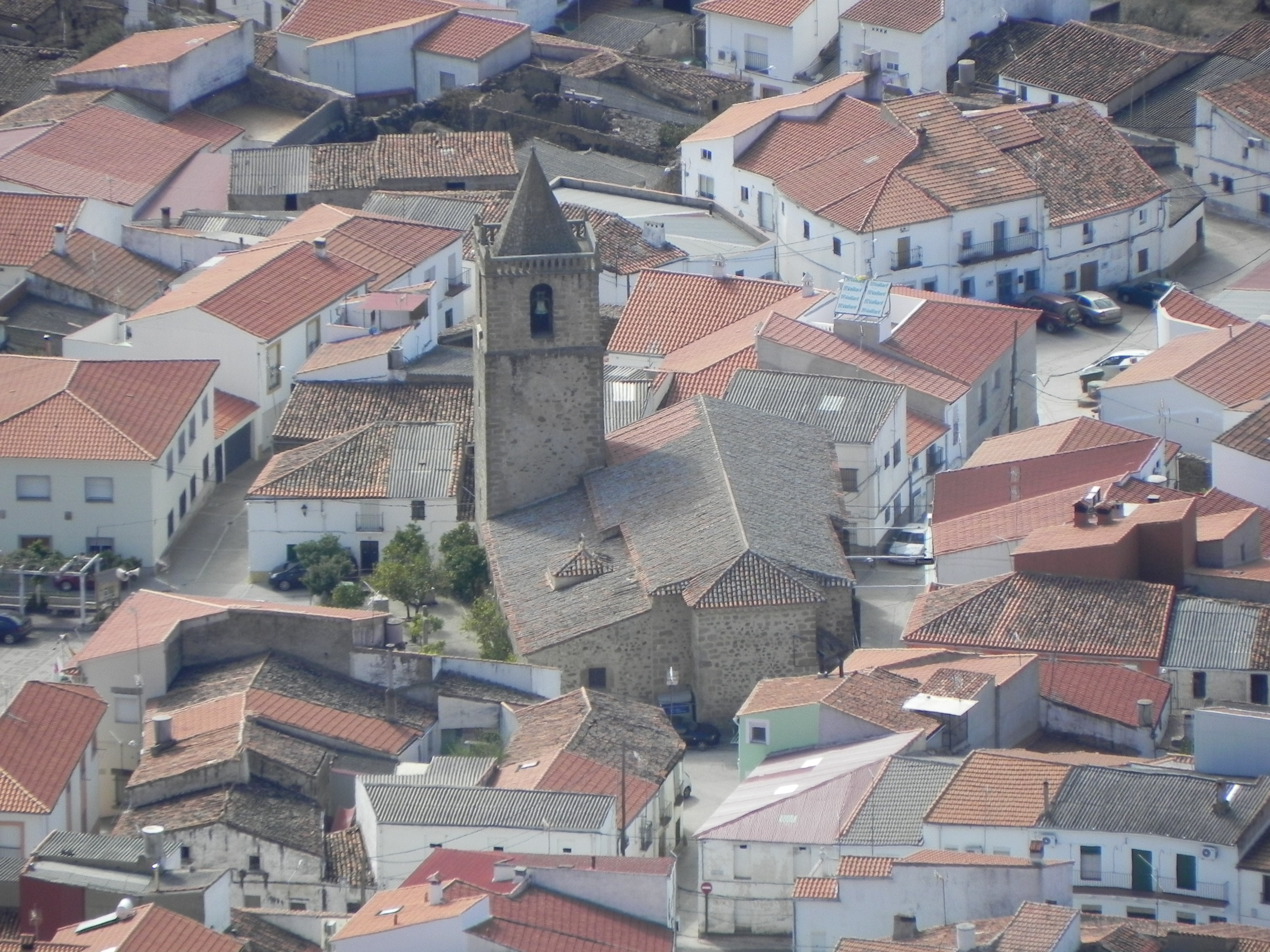
View Puerto de Santa Cruz from the San Gregorio Peak

== See also ==
- List of municipalities in Cáceres
