= Torrecilla de los Ángeles =

Coordinates: 40°15′N 6°25′W

Torrecilla de los Ángeles, Spain
- municipality
- Coat of arms
- Interactive map of Torrecilla de los Ángeles, Spain
- Country: Spain
- Autonomous community: Extremadura
- Province: Cáceres
- Municipality: Torrecilla de los Ángeles

Area
  - Total: 43 km^{2} (17 sq mi)

Population (2025-01-01)
  - Total: 642
  - Density: 15/km^{2} (39/sq mi)
- Time zone: UTC+1 (CET)
  - Summer (DST): UTC+2 (CEST)
- Website: www.torrecilladelosangeles.es

Torrecilla de los Ángeles is a municipality located in the province of Cáceres, Extremadura, Spain. According to the 2006 census (INE), the municipality had a population of 708 inhabitants.

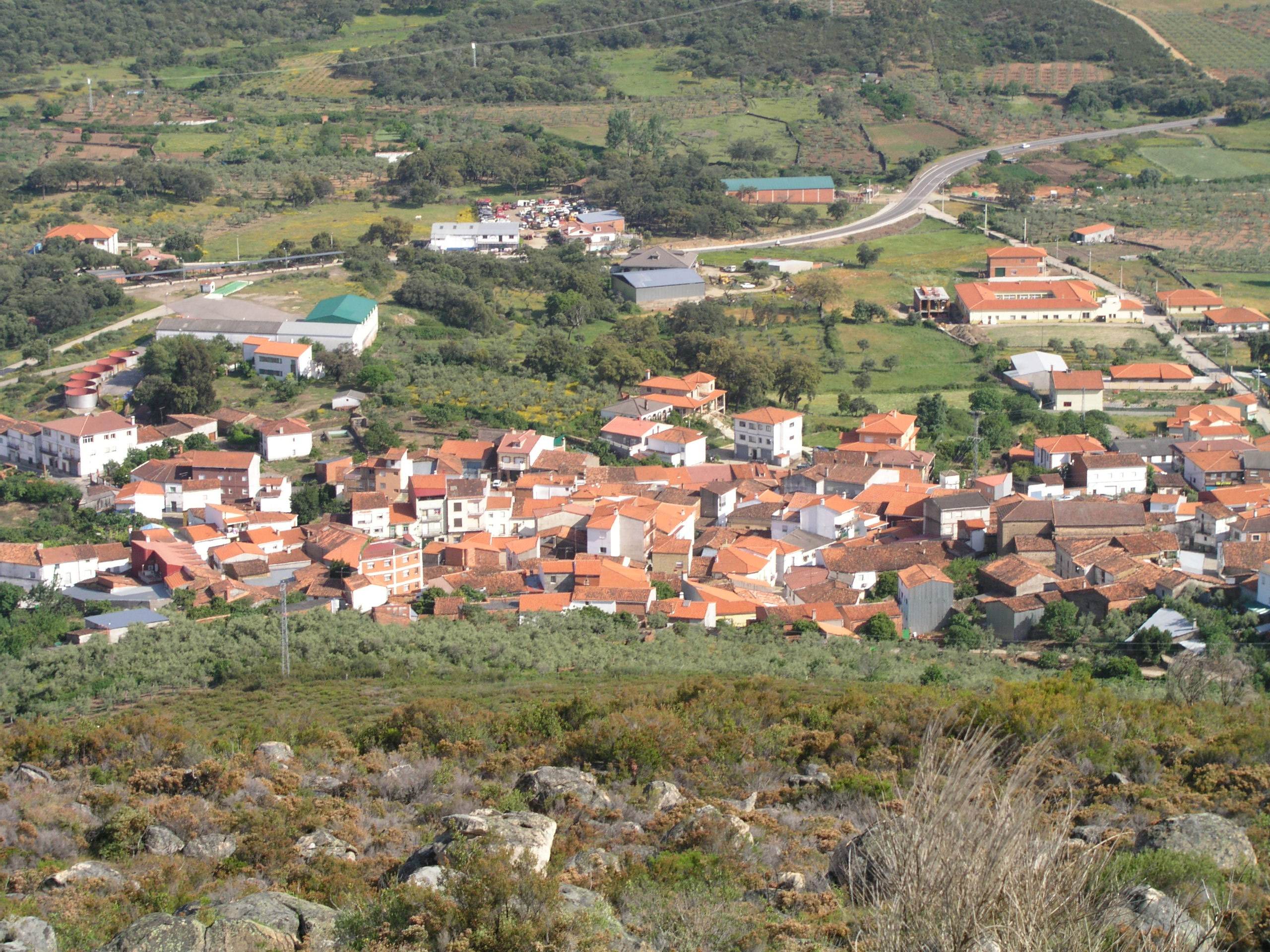
View of Torrecilla de los Ángeles

== See also ==
- List of municipalities in Cáceres
