= Salvatierra de Santiago =

Coordinates: 39°18′N 6°02′W

Salvatierra de Santiago, Spain
- municipality
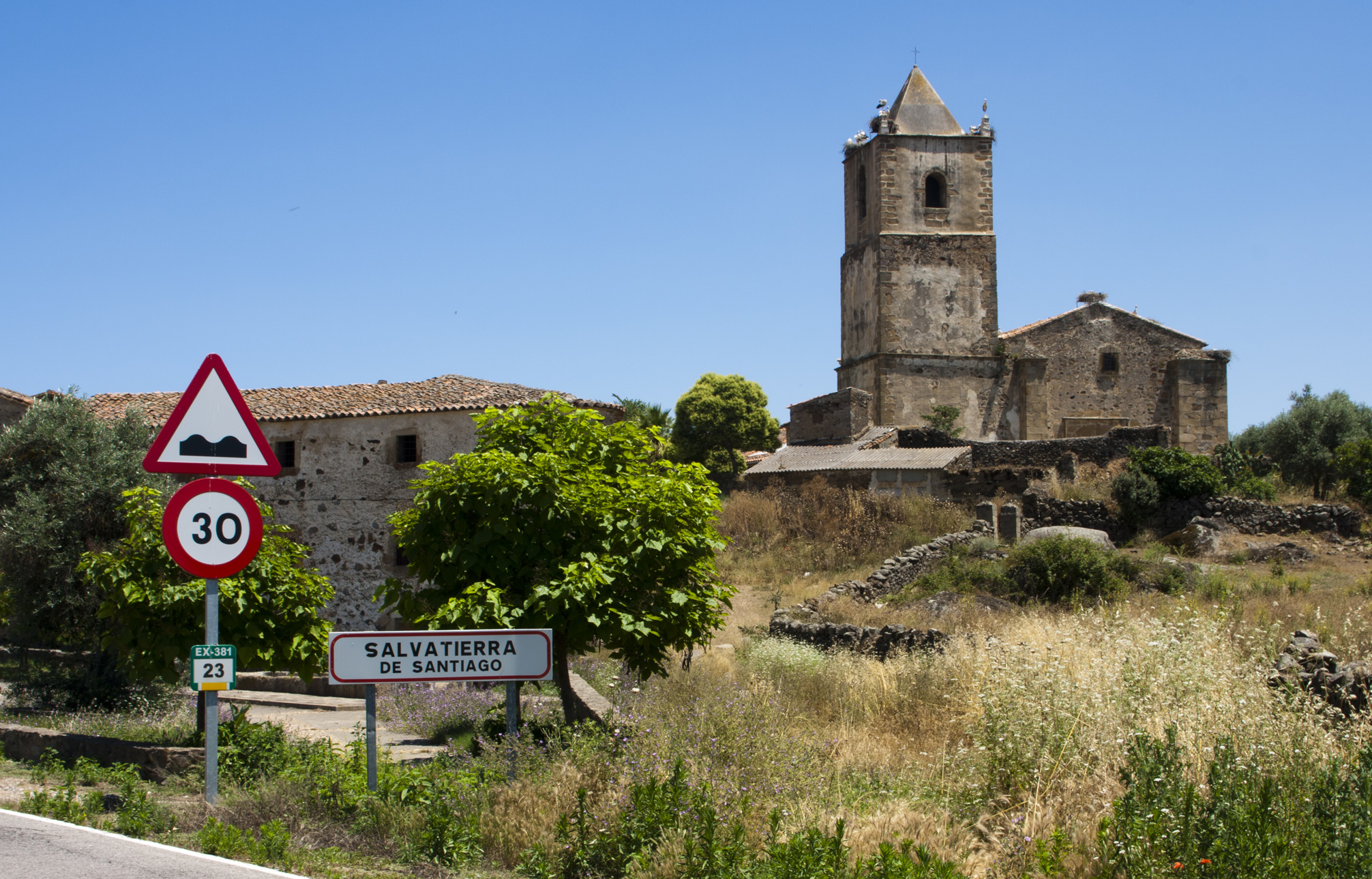

- Coat of arms
- Interactive map of Salvatierra de Santiago, Spain
- Country: Spain
- Autonomous community: Extremadura
- Province: Cáceres
- Municipality: Salvatierra de Santiago

Area
  - Total: 33 km^{2} (13 sq mi)

Population (2025-01-01)
  - Total: 229
  - Density: 6.9/km^{2} (18/sq mi)
- Time zone: UTC+1 (CET)
  - Summer (DST): UTC+2 (CEST)

Salvatierra de Santiago is a municipality located in the province of Cáceres, Extremadura, Spain. According to the 2006 census (INE), the municipality has a population of 355 inhabitants.

== See also ==
- List of municipalities in Cáceres
