= Zarza la Mayor =

Coordinates: 39°53′N 6°51′W

Zarza la Mayor, Spain
- municipality
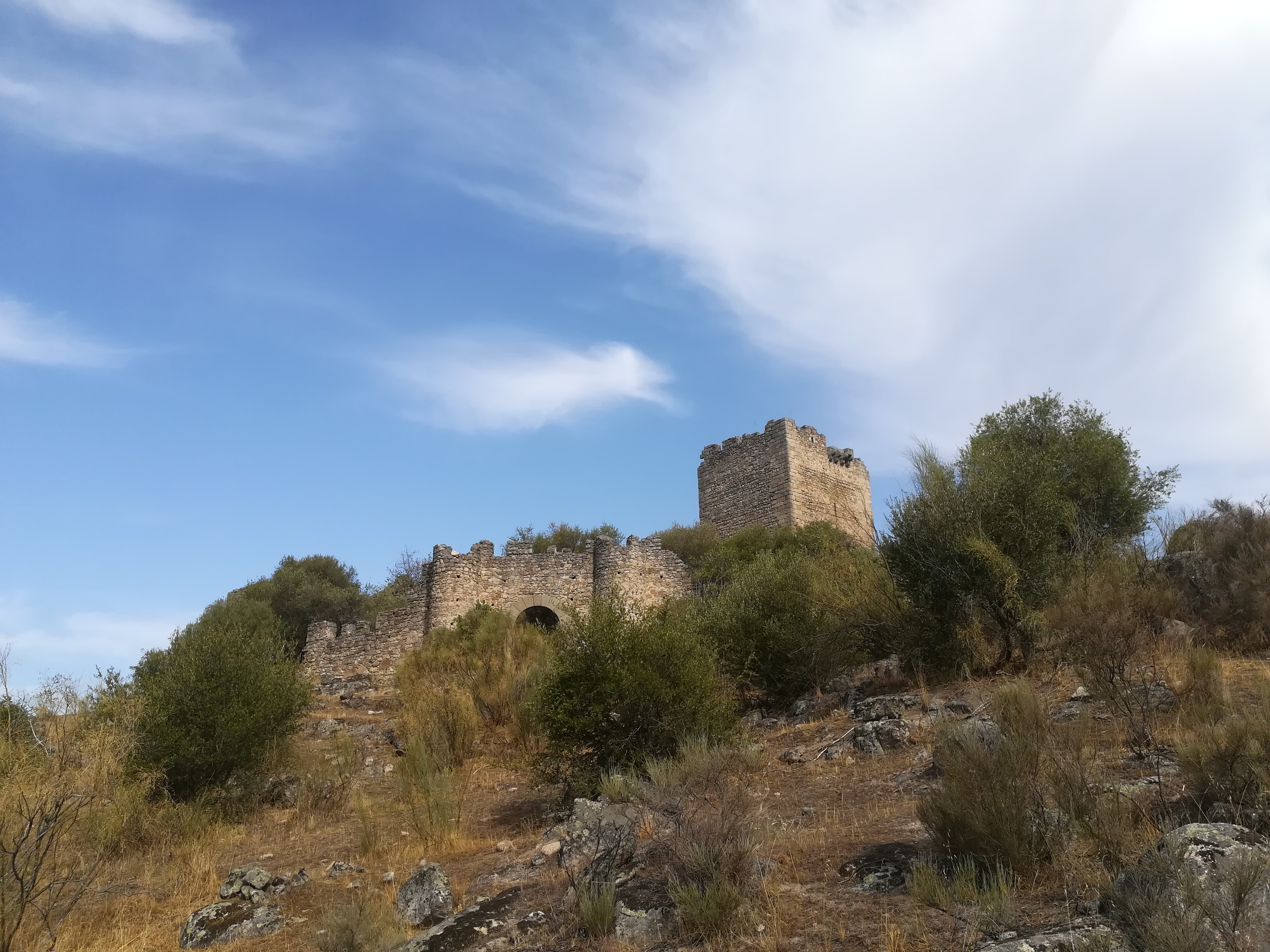
- Peñafiel Palace in Zarza la Mayor

- Flag Coat of arms

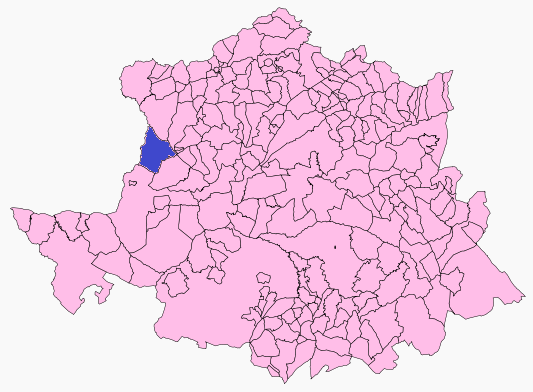
- Country: Spain
- Autonomous community: Extremadura
- Province: Cáceres
- Municipality: Zarza la Mayor

Area
  - Total: 170.28 km^{2} (65.75 sq mi)
- Elevation: 304 m (997 ft)

Population (2025-01-01)
  - Total: 1,096
  - Density: 6.436/km^{2} (16.67/sq mi)
- Time zone: UTC+1 (CET)
  - Summer (DST): UTC+2 (CEST)

Zarza la Mayor is a municipality located in the province of Cáceres, Extremadura, Spain. According to the 2018 census (INE), the municipality has a population of 1,258 inhabitants. This is the most occidental municipality in "Las Vegas de Alagón" region. It is the only municipality in the region that borders with Portugal.

== Geography ==
It is located 4 km in a straight line to Salvaterra do Extremo. The EX-117 road from Moraleja to Alcantara pass through Zarza la Mayor.

This municipality was especially important during Iberic Peninsula Moorish invasion. It can be seen today due to the strongholds present like Racha-Rachel (or Peñafiel, as it was called later by Christians) and Bernardo Castle (Castillo de Bernardo). After the Spanish 'reconquista', due that the conquested areas were left with no population to take care of the land, the military order of Alcantara created an 'Encomienda' (or to assign an area to landlords to take care of it) called 'Encomienda de Peñafiel y la Çarça'.

It was appointed as a Villa in 1356. During the 16th century the villa had a golden age that stopped suddenly when Portuguese Restoration War started.

The inhabitants of Zarza la Mayor were exiled by the Portuguese troops between 1665 and 1668. People returned between 1705 and 1713 during the War of the Spanish Succession.

Due to its complex history, Zarza la Mayor is a place were a number of monuments can be seen as San Andrés Apóstol church that was declared Conjunto histórico in 1982, and other chapels and castles.

== See also ==
- List of municipalities in Cáceres
