= Cabezabellosa =

- Municipality
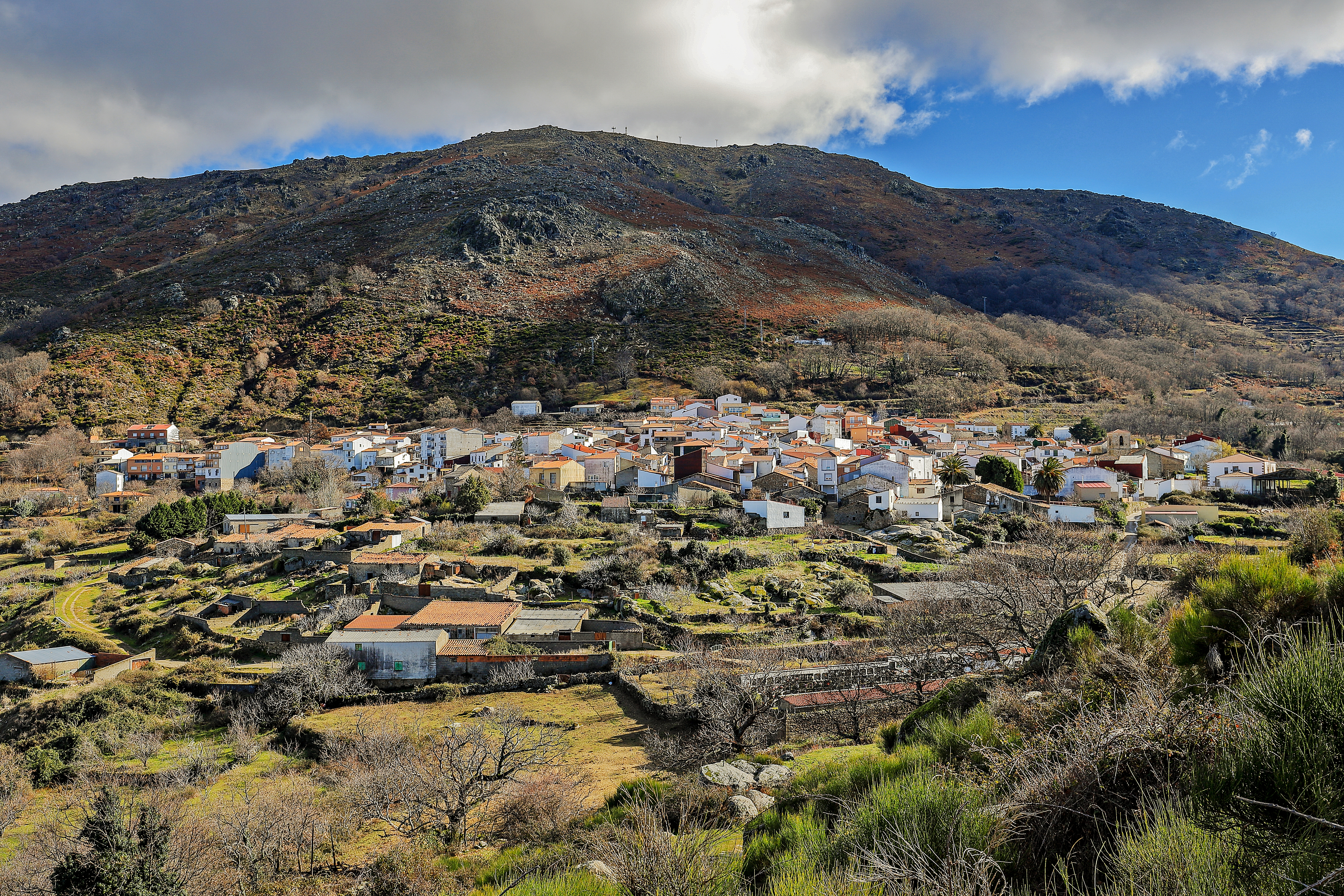
- Panoramic View of Cabezabellosa

- Coat of arms

- Location within Spain Location within Extremadura
- Coordinates: 40°7′59″N 6°0′0″W
- Country: Spain
- Autonomous community: Extremadura
- Province: Cáceres
- Municipality: Cabezabellosa

Government
  - Mayor: María Ángeles Talaván

Area
  - Total: 33.56 km^{2} (12.96 sq mi)
- Elevation: 836 m (2,743 ft)

Population (2025-01-01)
  - Total: 317
  - Density: 9.45/km^{2} (24.5/sq mi)
- Time zone: UTC+1 (CET)
  - Summer (DST): UTC+2 (CEST)
- Postal code: 10729
- Website: www.cabezabellosa.es

Cabezabellosa is a village in the province of Cáceres and autonomous community of Extremadura, Spain. The municipality covers an area of 34 square kilometres (13 sq mi) and as of 2011 had a population of 408 people.

== See also ==
- List of municipalities in Cáceres
