= Heras =

Heras may refer to:

== Places in Spain ==
- Heras, Casares de las Hurdes, a hamlet in Cáceres, Extremadura
- Heras de Ayuso, a municipality in Guadalajara, Castile-La Mancha
- Heras (Medio Cudeyo), a town in Medio Cudeyo, Cantabria

== Other uses ==
- Heras (moth), a genus of snout moths
- Heras (surname)
- Heras (physician), Ancient Greek physician from Cappadocia; see Azanites

== See also ==
- Hera (disambiguation)
