= Erias =

Erias may refer to:

== People ==
- Erias Lukwago (born 1970), Ugandan lawyer
- Antonio Erias, Spanish economist
- Bo Erias (1932–2007), American basketball player

== Other uses ==
- Las Erías, or Erias, hamlet in Spain

== See also ==
- Eria
