= Las Hurdes =

Coordinates: 40.379°N 6.28°W

- Historical region and Comarca
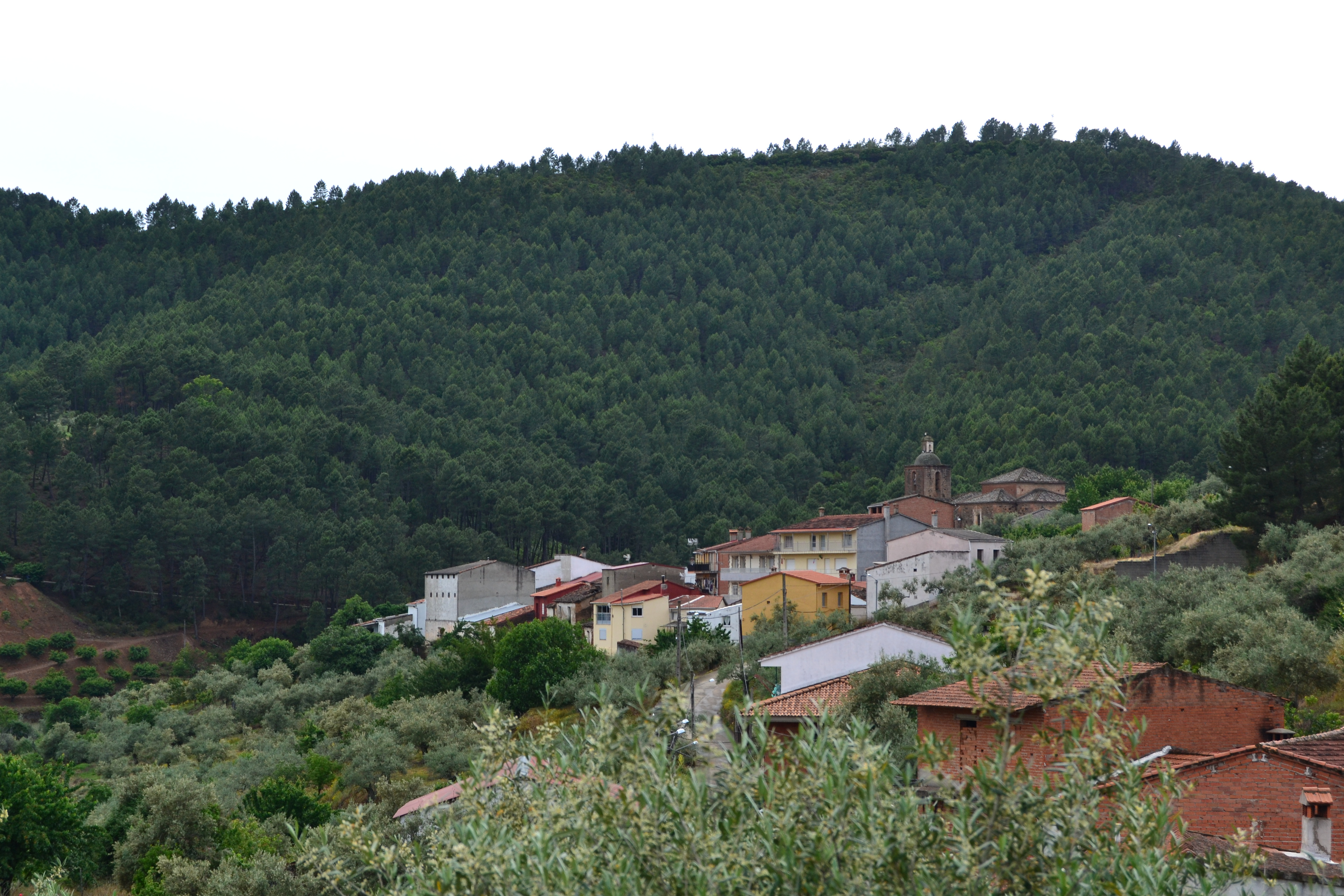
- View of Cambroncino, an alquería in Caminomorisco municipality

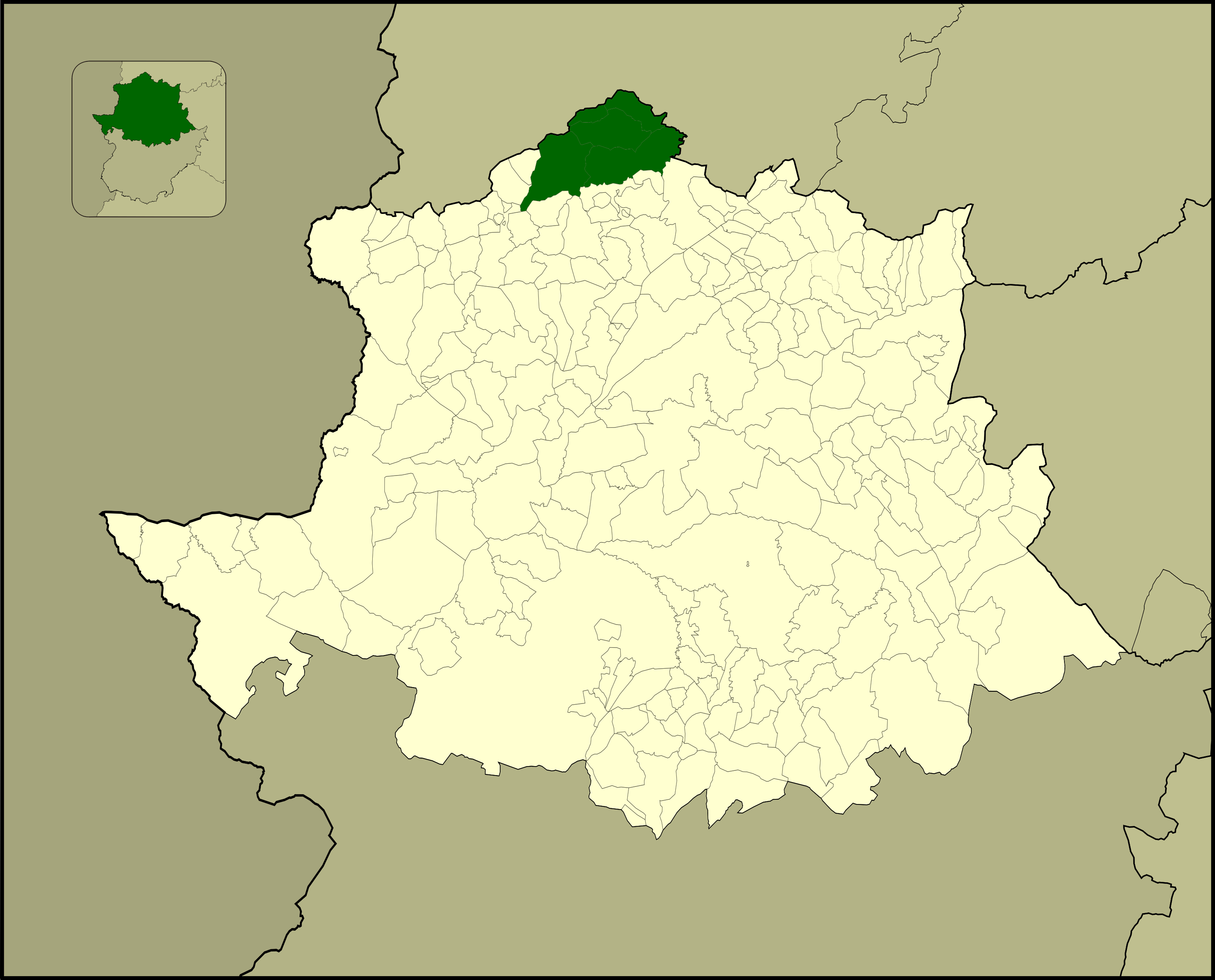
- Location in the province of Cáceres
- Country: Spain
- Autonomous community: Extremadura
- Province: Cáceres
- Municipalities: List: Caminomorisco, Casares de las Hurdes, Ladrillar, Nuñomoral, Pinofranqueado

Area
  - Total: 465.25 km^{2} (179.63 sq mi)

Population (2015)
  - Total: 5,227
  - Density: 11.23/km^{2} (29.10/sq mi)
- Time zone: UTC+1 (CET)
- Largest municipality: Pinofranqueado

Las Hurdes ([las ˈuɾðes]; Extremaduran: Las Jurdis) is a comarca in the Sistema Central, at the northern end of the province of Cáceres in the Autonomous Community of Extremadura, Spain. A well-known historical region, Las Hurdes is currently a Site of Community Importance of the European Union.

== Description ==
Las Hurdes covers an area of 470 square kilometres (180 mi^{2}), bordered with Sierra de Gata to the west, Sierra de Francia (Salamanca Province) of Castile-Leon to the north and Trasierra/Tierras de Granadilla to the south. It is a relatively high mountain region with low population density. Its territory is linked to the neighboring valley of Las Batuecas, in whose lower fringes lies the Las Mestas alquería which is historically part of Las Hurdes.

The average weather patterns of the region mark the climate in Las Hurdes as Mediterranean/Continental with Atlantic influence. Despite being usually included as part of the "humid" section of Spain ("España húmeda"), the physical conditions and natural vegetation are semiarid. There are seven rivers cutting stony valleys in Las Hurdes: The Río Malo or Ladrillar, Batuecas, Hurdano, Malvellido, Esperabán, Ovejuela and the Río de Los Ángeles.

== History ==
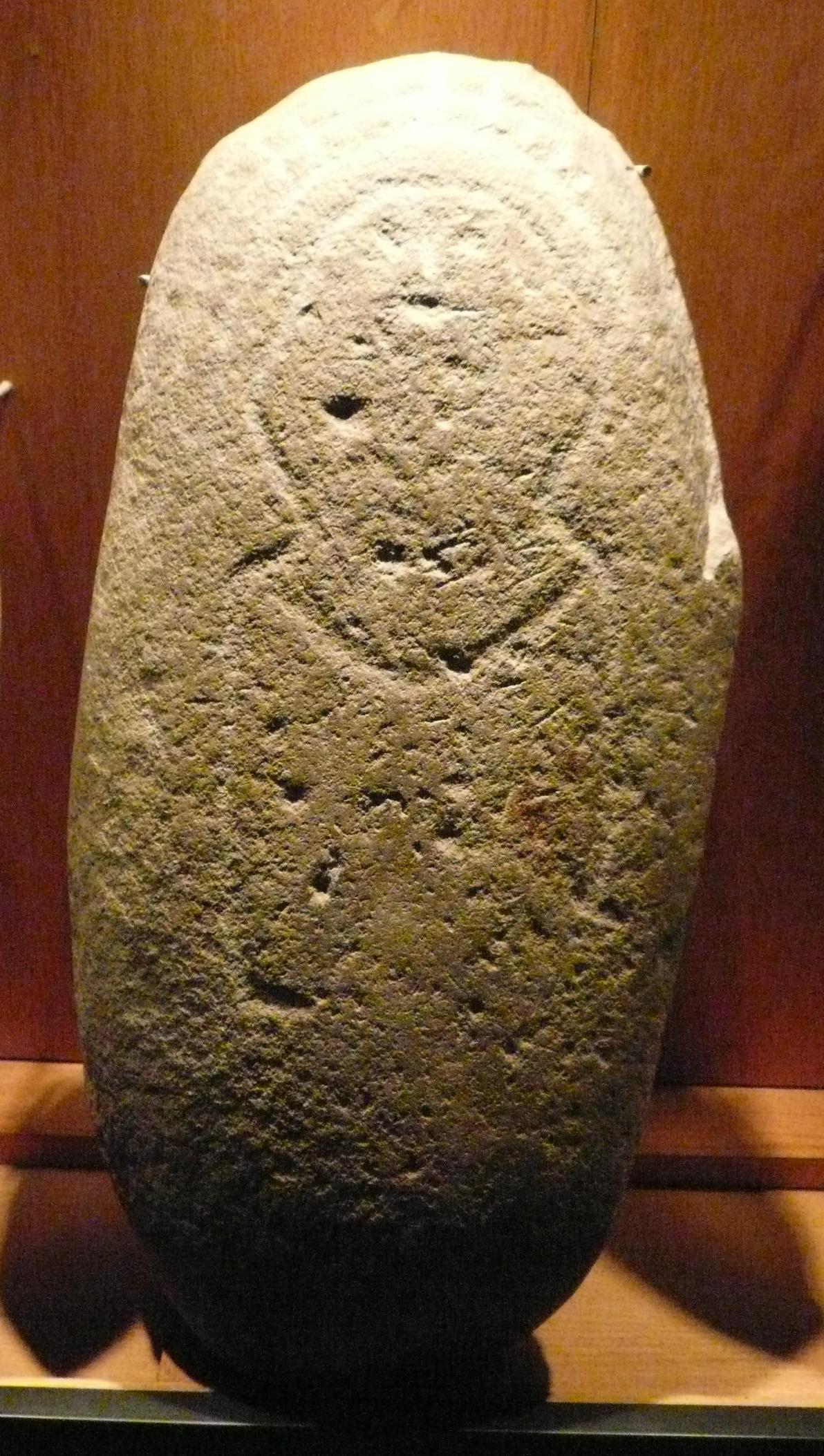
Prehistoric Cerezal stele (Chalcolithic, Las Hurdes).

=== Early history ===
Archaeological evidence has been found that Las Hurdes region was inhabited in the Chalcolithic Age. The oldest stone inscriptions (petroglyphs) date from about 4000 years before the Iberian Roman era began. The remains are largely testimonial, proving merely that the area was inhabited, for there is no evidence of large settlements.

Remains of settlements from Roman times, when the whole area around Las Hurdes was part of the ancient Roman province of Lusitania, have been found in sites near Caminomorisco.

The Las Hurdes region was depopulated after the Arab invasion of Spain in the 8th century, and the first vestiges of repopulation in isolated compounds of a few dwellings or hamlets, locally known as alquerías, are dated around the end of the 12th century.

=== The dark legend ===
The Las Hurdes region was remote, poor and isolated. The poor diet and general lack of hygiene meant that goiter, pellagra, parasitic worms and other, sometimes repulsive, diseases were common. Many of the local inhabitants (hurdanos) were also suffering from birth defects owing to inbreeding. Livestock illnesses were also widespread. The conditions in the households were unsanitary and, according to visitors, the stench and the misery were overwhelming. The name of the region is believed to derive from the Latin gurdus, a word of Iberian substrate origin meaning "doltish, stupid."

There was also no literacy in Las Hurdes owing to the harsh living conditions, as well as the distances and travel difficulties involved in reaching the closest centres of learning. The weak church presence favored widespread ignorance and the survival of ancient superstitions. The first census in Las Hurdes was made in the 16th century. And it is at that time when the legend of the darkness and backwardness surrounding the region began to be established.

Before 1635 playwright Lope de Vega set a comedy, Las Batuecas del Duque de Alba, in Las Hurdes in which he cast the area as a haunted place and its inhabitants as benighted and barbarous. Porque no saben que hay Dios / ni más mundo que este valle. (Because they do not know that there is a God/neither a world beyond this valley) Lope de Vega relied on writings by Alonso Sánchez, Prebendary of Salamanca (“De Rebus hispaniae”, Alcalá de Henares, 1632), who travelled to the region and was shocked by the poverty he saw, to write his play. As the centuries went by other Spanish writers would follow, casting Las Hurdes as a "bad and hidden place", thereby adding to the myth, the prejudice and the horrified fascination.

Even some serious chroniclers, like Pascual Madoz in his "Diccionario Geografico Estadistico-Historico", published in 1849, magnified the perceived savagery and moral degradation of the local Hurdanos, with statements like "religion is unknown (there)". This spurious contribution to the dark legend about the region was denounced by a leading Spanish intellectual, Marcelino Menéndez y Pelayo, who deemed that such information was "probably supplied by a disgruntled priest of the region" and that Madoz did not bother to verify it.

=== Efforts to change the image of the region ===
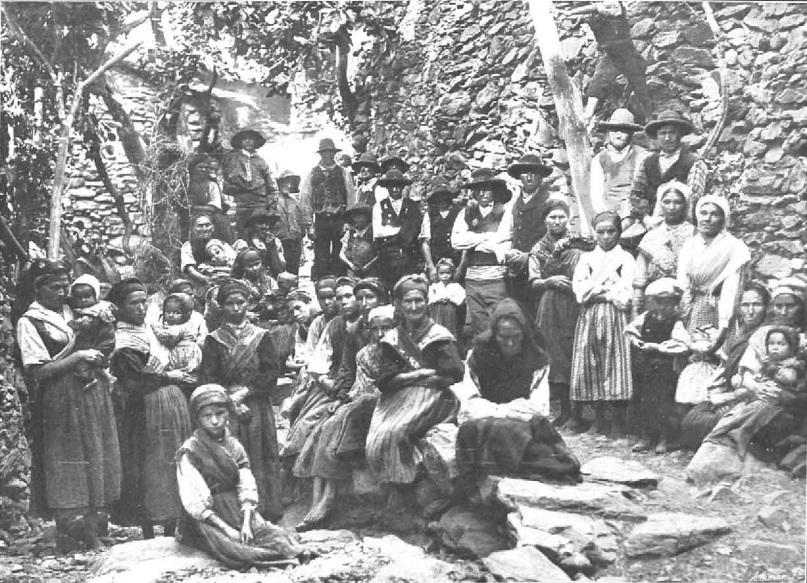
Group of Hurdanos at the beginning of the 20th century

At the end of the 19th century, however, las Hurdes was ushered into an unprecedented era of patronage and scholarly attention. Some people began to express publicly genuine concern for the extreme poverty, as well as the resulting abject living conditions, of the people in Las Hurdes. In 1892 French doctor J. B. Bidé travelled to Las Hurdes researching the region, drawing a map and publishing a report in the Boletín de la Sociedad Geográfica de Madrid. In 1904 José María Gabriel y Galán composed the poem "A Su Majestad el Rey" in Salamanca, asking the crown for help in favor of his forgotten subjects in las Hurdes. This poem was published in "Las Hurdes", a magazine issued for the first time that same year in order to create awareness about the needs of the region.

Finally Francisco Jarrín y Moro, then bishop of Coria, established a philanthropic society, "Sociedad Esperanza de Las Hurdes", in 1908. This first organized move attracted many participants in certain key cities keen to take initiatives in order to alleviate the backwardness and superstition of the region's inhabitants. Maurice Legendre, French Catholic intellectual and head of the French Institute in Madrid, visited Las Hurdes in 1912 and denounced the historical neglect of the region. In 1914 he invited his friend and fellow intellectual Miguel de Unamuno to travel through las Hurdes. Legendre visited the region again in 1922 with an official Comisión Sanitaria; led by his friend Doctor Gregorio Marañón the latter prepared the ground for the royal visit the same year.

King Alfonso XIII visited Las Hurdes in 1922 in order to display the concern of the crown. Gregorio Marañón accompanied the young king as guide. The king and his retinue lived in military tents planted near the town of Casares de las Hurdes. During the king's visit a famous awkward incident took place: One of the king´s Ministers, Vicente de Piniés, Minister of the Interior (Gobernación) having been served dinner at the king´s tent was offered coffee and he noted that he liked his coffee with a few drops of milk. In this underdeveloped region of Spain cows and sheep had not been seen by any of the king’s party. But the waiter left the tent and came back with a small jug of milk. While the Minister was drinking his café cortado, a local man entered the king’s tent and said, “Mr. Minister, rest assured that the milk is totally trustworthy since it is my wife´s milk,” who had recently given birth.

In 1927 Legendre published an ethnographic study about Las Hurdes. This study was read by Luis Buñuel, who continued the gloomy legend that cast a pall over the area by means of the modern media. In a short but famous 1933 film about the hurdanos, Las Hurdes: Tierra Sin Pan, that Buñuel shot around the town of La Alberca, Las Hurdes was portrayed as an isolated spot full of darkness. Buñuel exaggerated some scenes of the film by staging them beforehand in order to create strong impressions in the public. Screening of Buñuel's movie was banned by the authorities at that time, the Government of the Second Spanish Republic, for allegedly exploiting the misery in which the local people lived.

=== Present day ===
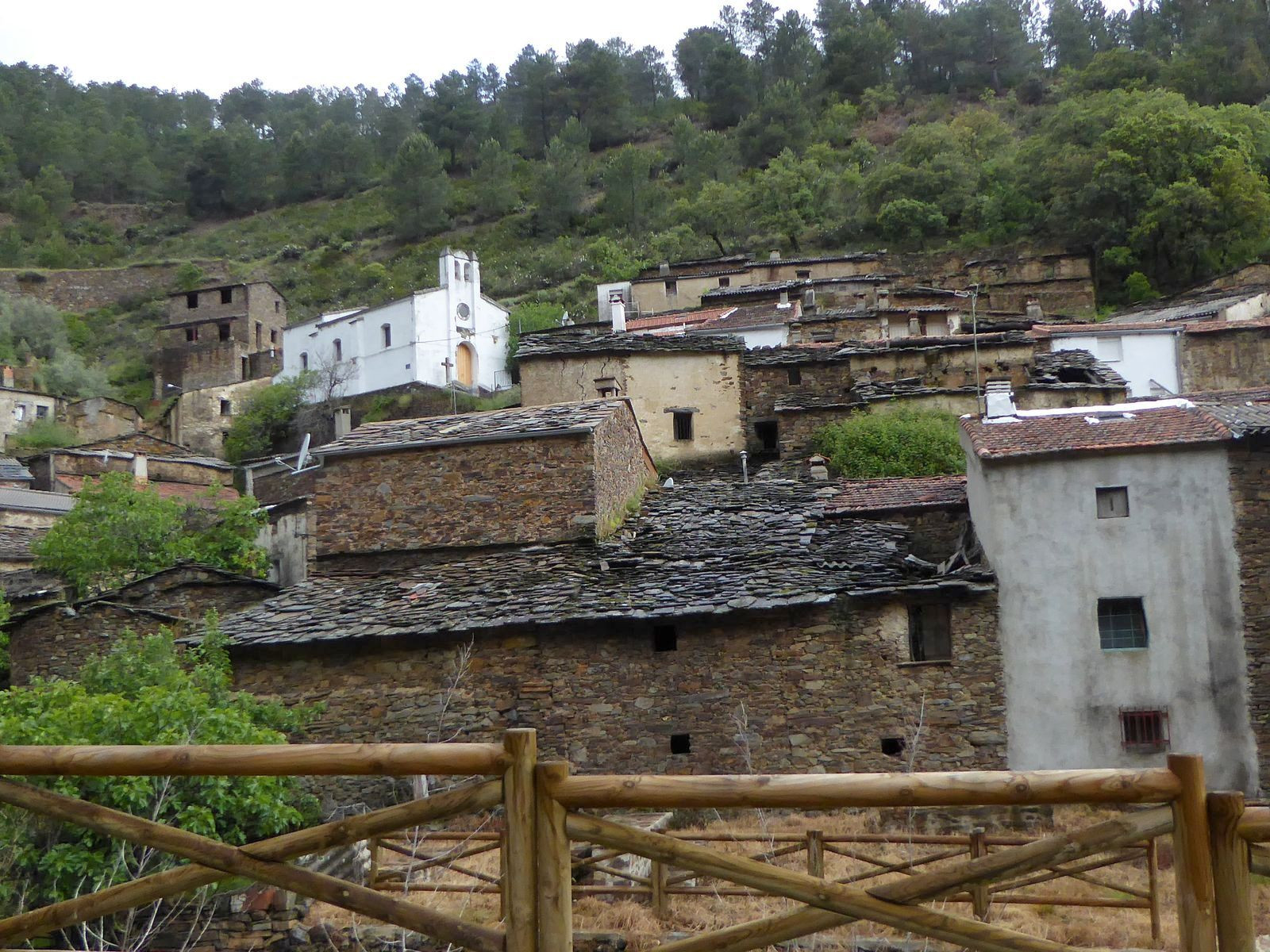
View of Río Malo de Arriba, one of the traditional hamlets of Las Hurdes

During Francisco Franco's era las Hurdes entered a time of economic stagnation and population loss, as urban centers and some areas close to the coast were favored for development much to the detriment of rural Spain. Following the dictatorship's Plan de Estabilización in 1959, the population declined steeply as people emigrated towards the industrial areas of the large cities and the coastal towns where tourism grew exponentially. Between 1955 and 1975 many Hurdanos left behind small villages where living conditions were often harsh, with cold snowy winters and very basic facilities. Some places like Arrocerezo, La Batuequilla, La Horcajada and El Moral, among others, were abandoned and became ghost towns.

In 1976, at the beginning of the transition to democracy, minister Manuel Fraga Iribarne visited Las Hurdes and drew a plan to do away with the bad name of the region and boost its economy called Plan Hurdes. Fraga's plan was welcomed by Las Hurdes' inhabitants for the positive publicity and the fanfare it provided, but it met with scant success. Spearheaded by ICONA, much reafforestation was done by planting pines, a non-indigenous species, on formerly bare mountain slopes. This measure was counterproductive for the traditional goatherders and beekeepers, for the new forests killed the smaller flowering bushes and aromatic plants favoured by goats and bees. The pine woods also made the region highly vulnerable to fires. Other complaints by locals living in alquerías in Valle del Malvellido are that the new forests obliterated ancient paths and clogged wells. New houses were built and the traditional houses of stone and shale, often small and overcrowded, were replaced with modern dwellings. In places like Las Mestas no ancestral houses have been left.

The Asociación Sociocultural de Las Hurdes (ASHURDES), was established in 1985. It organized the "II Congreso Nacional de Hurdanos y Hurdanófilos" in 1988, where it sought to ask for greater participation of the local people in policies concerning Las Hurdes. The chief concerns of the ca. 6,000 present day inhabitants of the region are to fight against the stigma issues affecting Las Hurdes and to reverse its depopulation. Despite the presence of experts in the congress, its effect and responses have been less marked than during the 1908 church-led philanthropic effort.

King Juan Carlos and Queen Sofia visited Pinofranqueado in Las Hurdes in April 1998, the first royal visit since 1922. In his speech the king praised the Hurdanos for having overcome the miseries and illnesses of the past. Despite all the media attention trying to cast an appearance of normality, the region still faces difficulties. While Caminomorisco and Pinofranqueado have seen a certain measure of development, Nuñomoral, Casares de las Hurdes and Ladrillar are in recession, losing population owing to emigration to the cities and the ageing of those who remain in the villages.

In 2001, thanks to the Plan Hidrológico Nacional scheme, water supply to the regions of Las Hurdes and La Vera was improved. Nowadays Las Hurdes is a good holiday destination for city-dwellers because of its scant population, its pristine wilderness and its landscapes. Thanks largely to tourism, present-day standards of living have risen to the average Spanish levels.

== Economy ==
Las Hurdes was once one of the poorest regions in Spain. Its traditional economy was based on agriculture, including olives, potatoes, cherries, forest products, cork, and goat herding.

In recent years, the economy of the area has flourished due mainly to tourism and beekeeping. There is a company commercializing the region's honey.

== Gastronomy ==
Local cuisine is based on different ways of preparing goat (cabrito en caldereta, cabrito en cuchifrito, cabrito a la sal and cabrito a la hortelana). One dish (cabrito al polen) includes pollen in the recipe. The pork products (embutidos) of Las Hurdes have a taste particular to the region, like the local chorizos and the morcilla de calabaza, made with pork blood and pumpkin.

Among the staples, the best known are the habichuelas and a stew with offal known as olla con "asaura".

Las Hurdes sweets (buñuelos, hijuelas, bollos fritos (fried buns), roscas, floretas, socochones hurdanos and jeringas) are mostly based on the local honey, as well as lard and flour. The pollen and honey candy caramelos de miel y polen is perhaps the most well-known local sweet outside of the area.

== Main towns ==
Map of Las Hurdes

Despite the heavy depopulation, there are still some people living in about 40 traditional alquerías, such as Las Mestas, scattered through the region. The main towns in Las Hurdes are:

- Caminomorisco
- Casares de las Hurdes
- Ladrillar
- Nuñomoral
- Pinofranqueado

Casar de Palomero, historically not part of Las Hurdes, has been merged with the other municipalities of the comarca to form the Mancomunidad de Las Hurdes.
