= Sauceda, Pinofranqueado =

Sauceda
- Alqueria
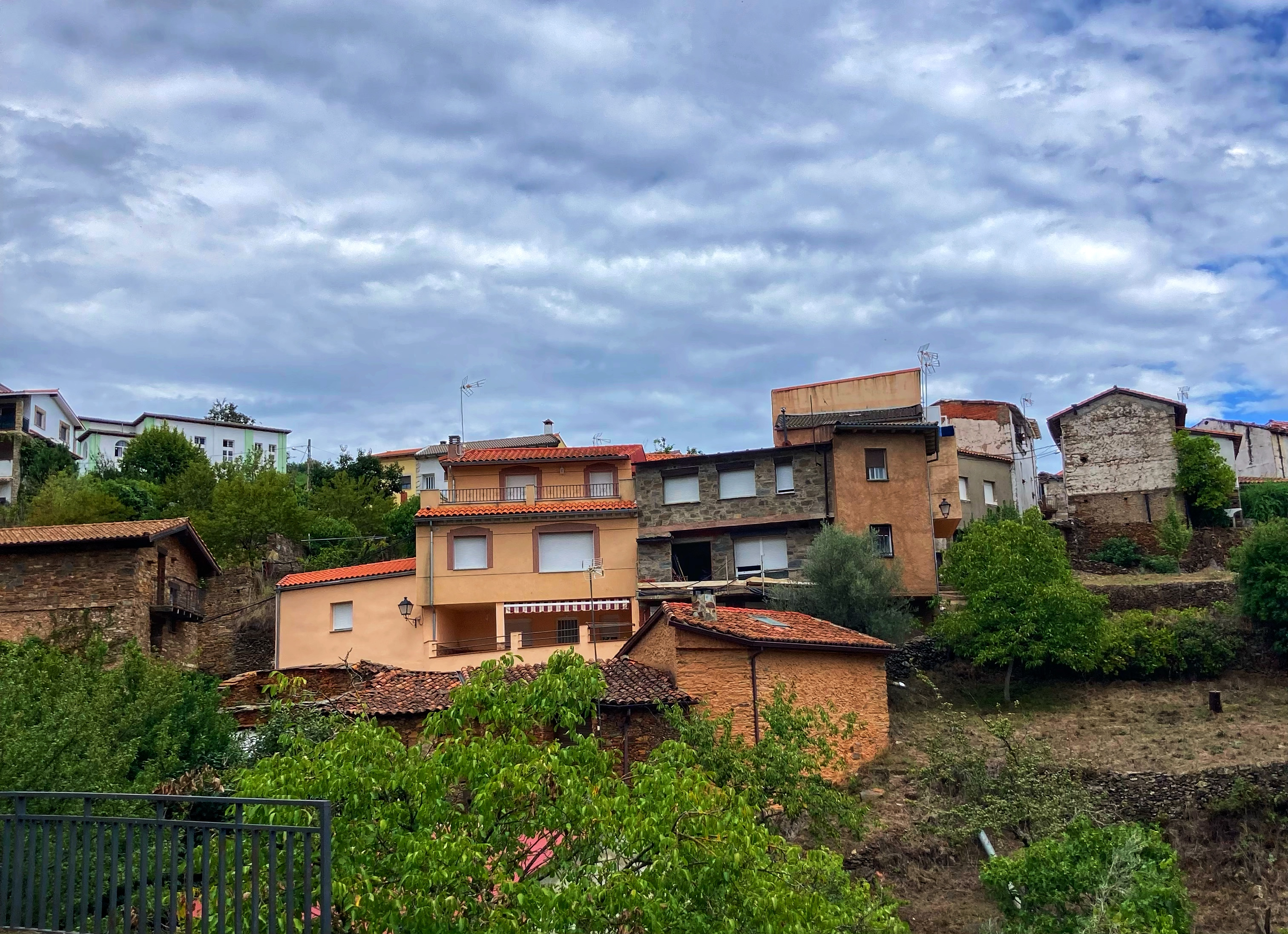

- Location within Extremadura Location within Spain
- Coordinates: 40°18′7″N 6°21′26″W
- Country: Spain
- Autonomous community: Extremadura
- Province: Province of Cáceres
- Municipality: Pinofranqueado
- Elevation: 452 m (1,483 ft)

Population
  - Total: 69

Sauceda is a hamlet and alqueria located in the municipality of Pinofranqueado, in Cáceres province, Extremadura, Spain. As of 2020, it has a population of 69.

== Geography ==
Sauceda is located 132km north of Cáceres, Spain.
