= Huetre, Casares de las Hurdes =

Huetre
- Alquería
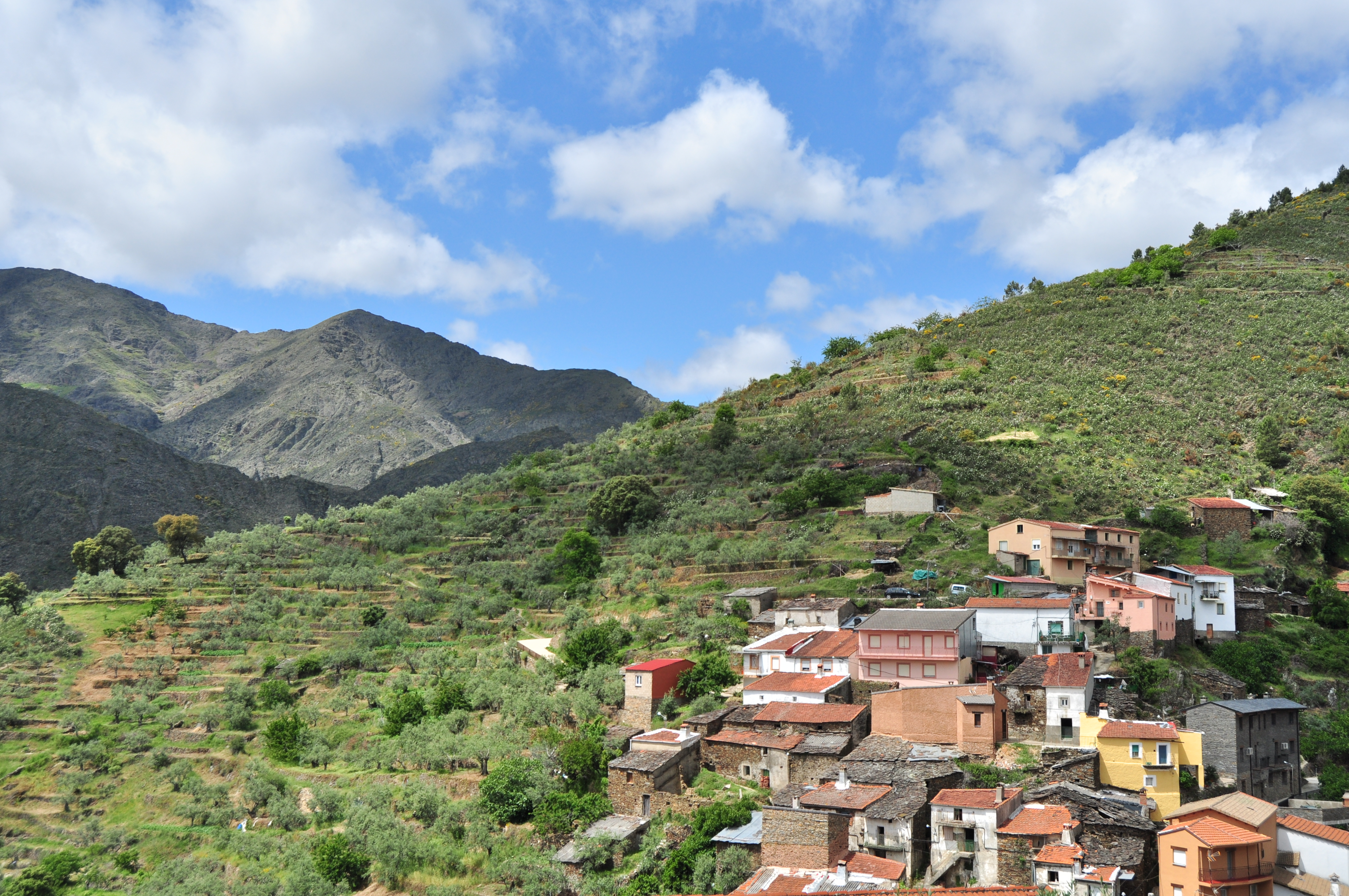

- Location within Extremadura Location within Spain
- Coordinates: 40°26′36″N 6°18′17″W
- Country: Spain
- Autonomous community: Extremadura
- Province: Province of Cáceres
- Municipality: Casares de las Hurdes
- Elevation: 679 m (2,228 ft)

Population
  - Total: 135

Huetre is a hamlet and alqueria located in the municipality of Casares de las Hurdes, in Cáceres province, Extremadura, Spain. As of 2020, it has a population of 135.

== Geography ==
Huetre is located 185 km north of Cáceres, Spain.
