= Riomalo de Abajo =

- Alqueria
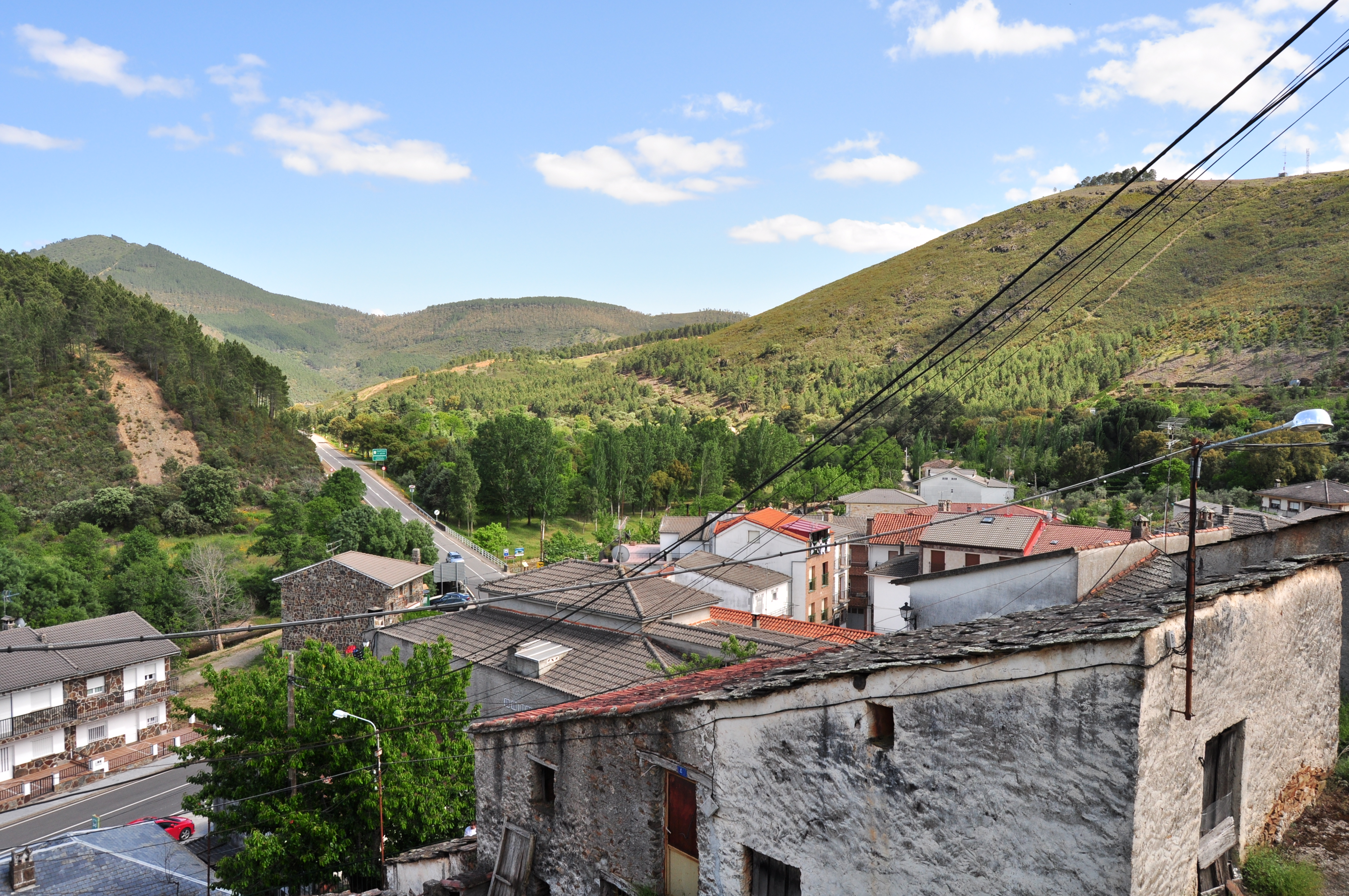

- Location within Extremadura Location within Spain
- Coordinates: 40°24′16″N 6°5′9″W
- Country: Spain
- Autonomous community: Extremadura
- Province: Province of Cáceres
- Municipality: Caminomorisco
- Elevation: 401 m (1,316 ft)

Population
  - Total: 36

Riomalo de Abajo is a hamlet and alqueria located in the municipality of Caminomorisco, in Cáceres province, Extremadura, Spain. As of 2020, it has a population of 36.

== Geography ==
Riomalo de Abajo is located 158km north-northeast of Cáceres.
