= Horcajo =

- Alqueria
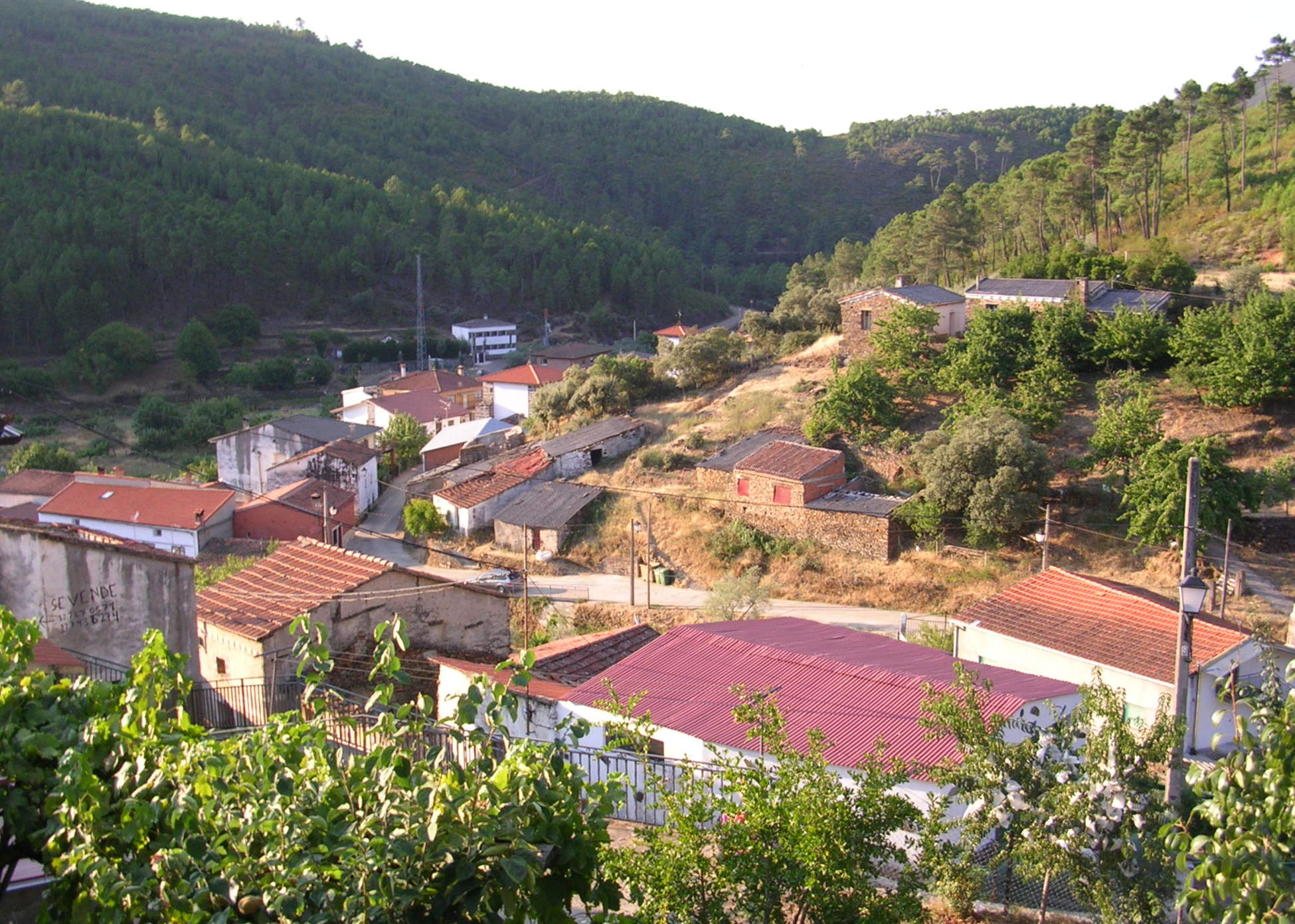

- Location within Extremadura Location within Spain
- Coordinates: 40°21′47″N 6°21′37″W
- Country: Spain
- Autonomous community: Extremadura
- Province: Province of Cáceres
- Municipality: Pinofranqueado
- Elevation: 553 m (1,814 ft)

Population
  - Total: 56

Horcajo is a hamlet and alqueria located in the municipality of Pinofranqueado, in Cáceres province, Extremadura, Spain. As of 2020, it has a population of 56.

== Geography ==
Horcajo is located 140km north of Cáceres, Spain.
