= Castillo, Pinofranqueado =

Castillo
- Alqueria
- Location within Extremadura Location within Spain
- Coordinates: 40°21′16″N 6°22′46″W
- Country: Spain
- Autonomous community: Extremadura
- Province: Province of Cáceres
- Municipality: Pinofranqueado
- Elevation: 568 m (1,864 ft)

Population
  - Total: 71

Castillo is a hamlet and alqueria located in the municipality of Pinofranqueado, in Cáceres province, Extremadura, Spain. As of 2020, it has a population of 71.

== Geography ==
Castillo is located 141km north of Cáceres, Spain.
