= Arrolobos =

- Alqueria
- Location within Extremadura Location within Spain
- Coordinates: 40°22′46″N 6°9′51″W
- Country: Spain
- Autonomous community: Extremadura
- Province: Province of Cáceres
- Municipality: Caminomorisco
- Elevation: 396 m (1,299 ft)

Population
  - Total: 128

Arrolobos is a village and alqueria located in the municipality of Caminomorisco, in Cáceres province, Extremadura, Spain. As of 2020, it has a population of 128.

== Geography ==
Arrolobos is located 171km north-northeast of Cáceres, Spain.
