= Riomalo de Arriba =

- Alqueria
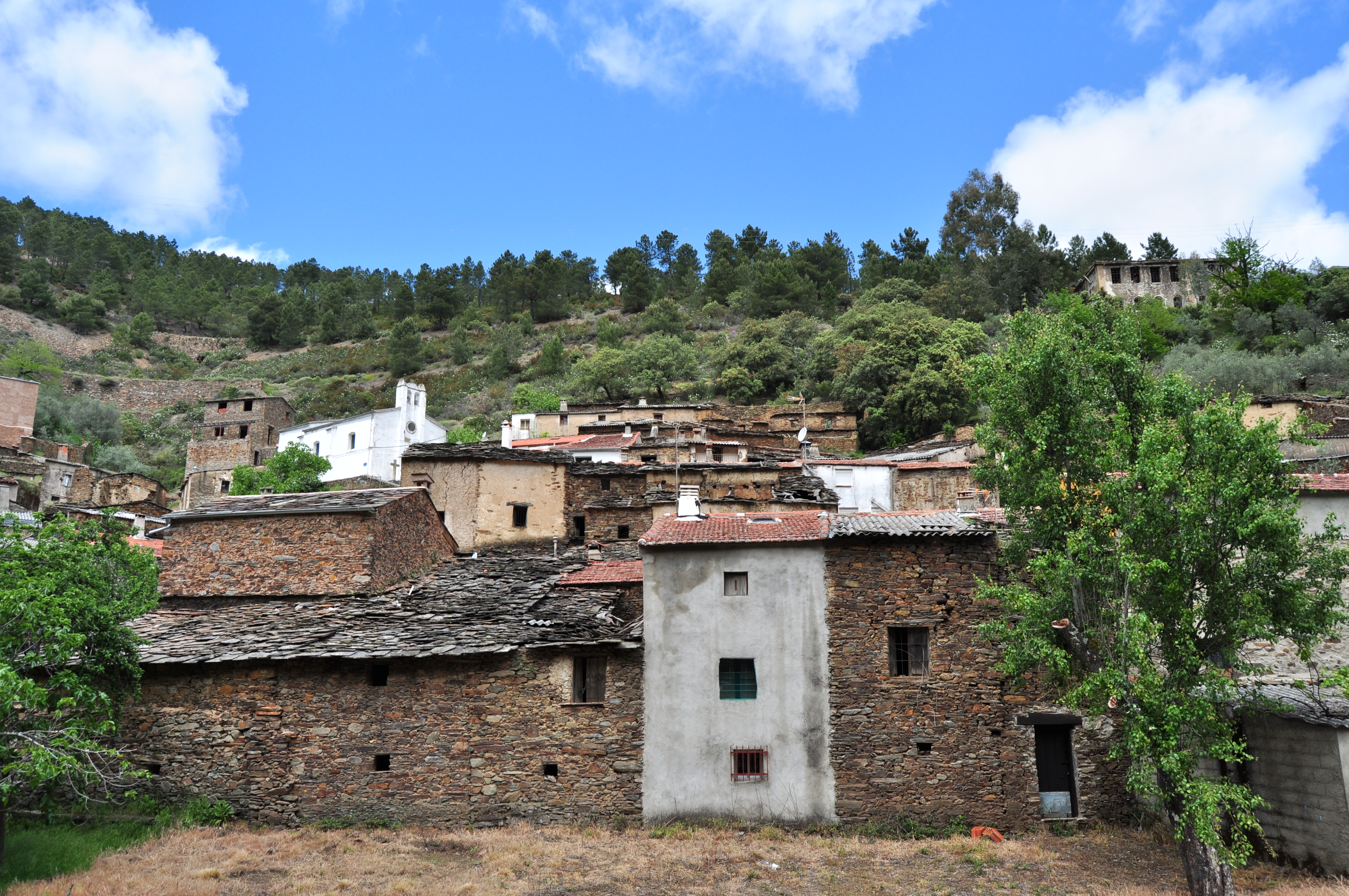

- Location within Extremadura Location within Spain
- Coordinates: 40°27′27″N 6°15′18″W
- Country: Spain
- Autonomous community: Extremadura
- Province: Province of Cáceres
- Municipality: Ladrillar
- Elevation: 757 m (2,484 ft)

Population
  - Total: 4

Riomalo de Arriba is a hamlet and alqueria located in the municipality of Ladrillar, in Cáceres province, Extremadura, Spain. As of 2020, it has a population of 4.

== Geography ==
Riomalo de Arriba is located 181km north of Cáceres.
