= Cabezo =

- Alqueria
- Location within Extremadura Location within Spain
- Coordinates: 40°26′56″N 6°11′17″W
- Country: Spain
- Autonomous community: Extremadura
- Province: Province of Cáceres
- Municipality: Ladrillar
- Elevation: 586 m (1,923 ft)

Population
  - Total: 48

Cabezo is a hamlet and alqueria located in the municipality of Ladrillar, in Cáceres province, Extremadura, Spain. As of 2020, it has a population of 48.

== Geography ==
Cabezo is located 170km north of Cáceres, Spain.
