= Carabusino =

- Alqueria
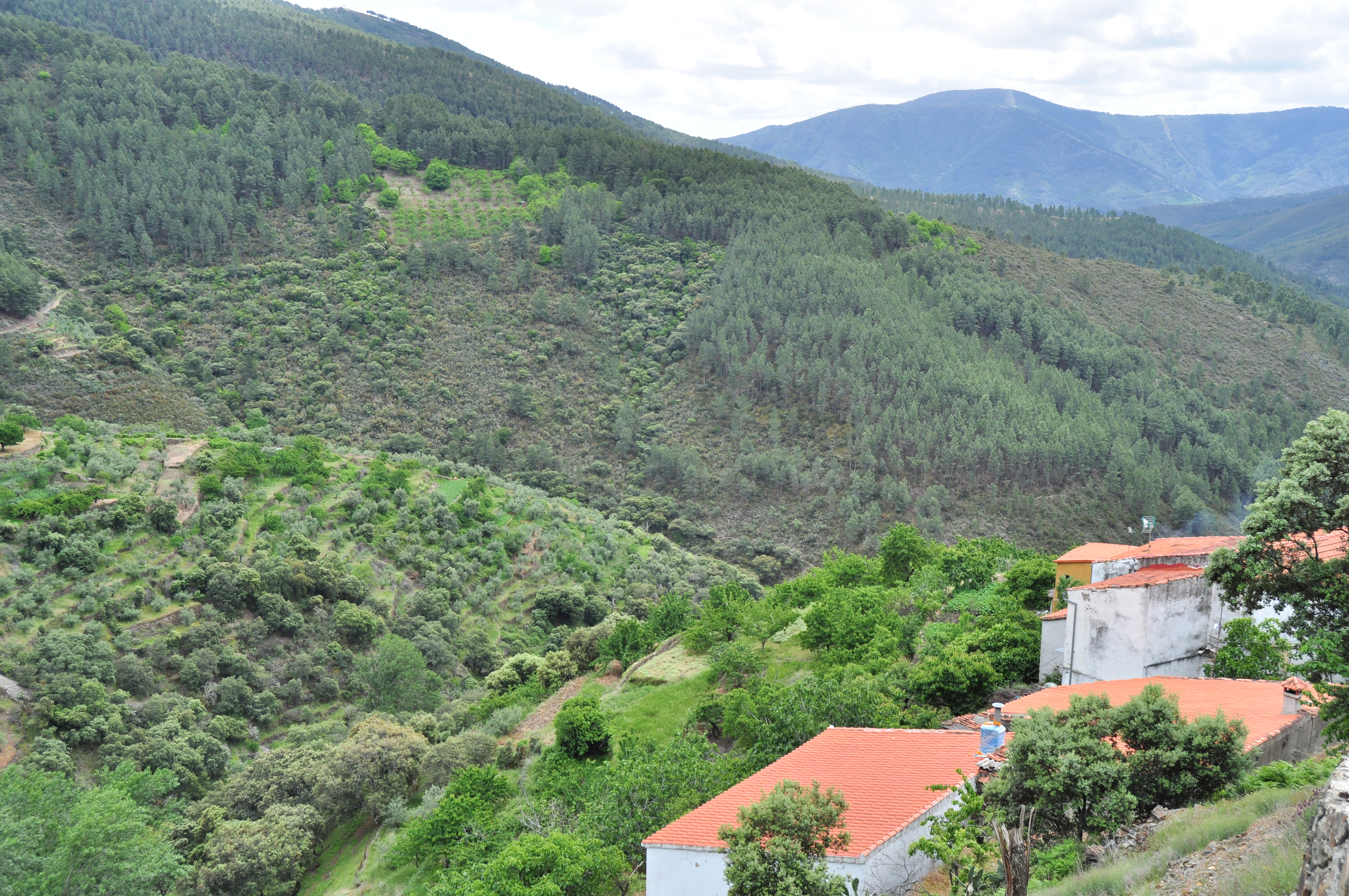

- Location within Extremadura Location within Spain
- Coordinates: 40°26′53″N 6°17′4″W
- Country: Spain
- Autonomous community: Extremadura
- Province: Province of Cáceres
- Municipality: Casares de las Hurdes
- Elevation: 826 m (2,710 ft)

Population
  - Total: 38

Carabusino is a village and alqueria located in the municipality of Casares de las Hurdes, in Cáceres province, Extremadura, Spain. As of 2020, it has a population of 38.

== Geography ==
Carabusino is located 185km north of Cáceres, Spain.
