= Robledo, Pinofranqueado =

Robledo
- Alqueria
- Location within Extremadura Location within Spain
- Coordinates: 40°19′42″N 6°20′20″W
- Country: Spain
- Autonomous community: Extremadura
- Province: Province of Cáceres
- Municipality: Pinofranqueado
- Elevation: 505 m (1,657 ft)

Population
  - Total: 50

Robledo is a hamlet and alqueria located in the municipality of Pinofranqueado, in Cáceres province, Extremadura, Spain. As of 2020, it has a population of 50.

== Geography ==
Robledo is located 134km north of Cáceres, Spain.
