= Mesegal =

- Alqueria
- Location within Extremadura Location within Spain
- Coordinates: 40°18′51″N 6°19′0″W
- Country: Spain
- Autonomous community: Extremadura
- Province: Province of Cáceres
- Municipality: Pinofranqueado
- Elevation: 497 m (1,631 ft)

Population
  - Total: 30

Mesegal is a hamlet and alqueria located in the municipality of Pinofranqueado, in Cáceres province, Extremadura, Spain. As of 2020, it has a population of 30.

== Geography ==
Mesegal is located 132km north of Cáceres, Spain.
