= Casarrubia =

- Alqueria
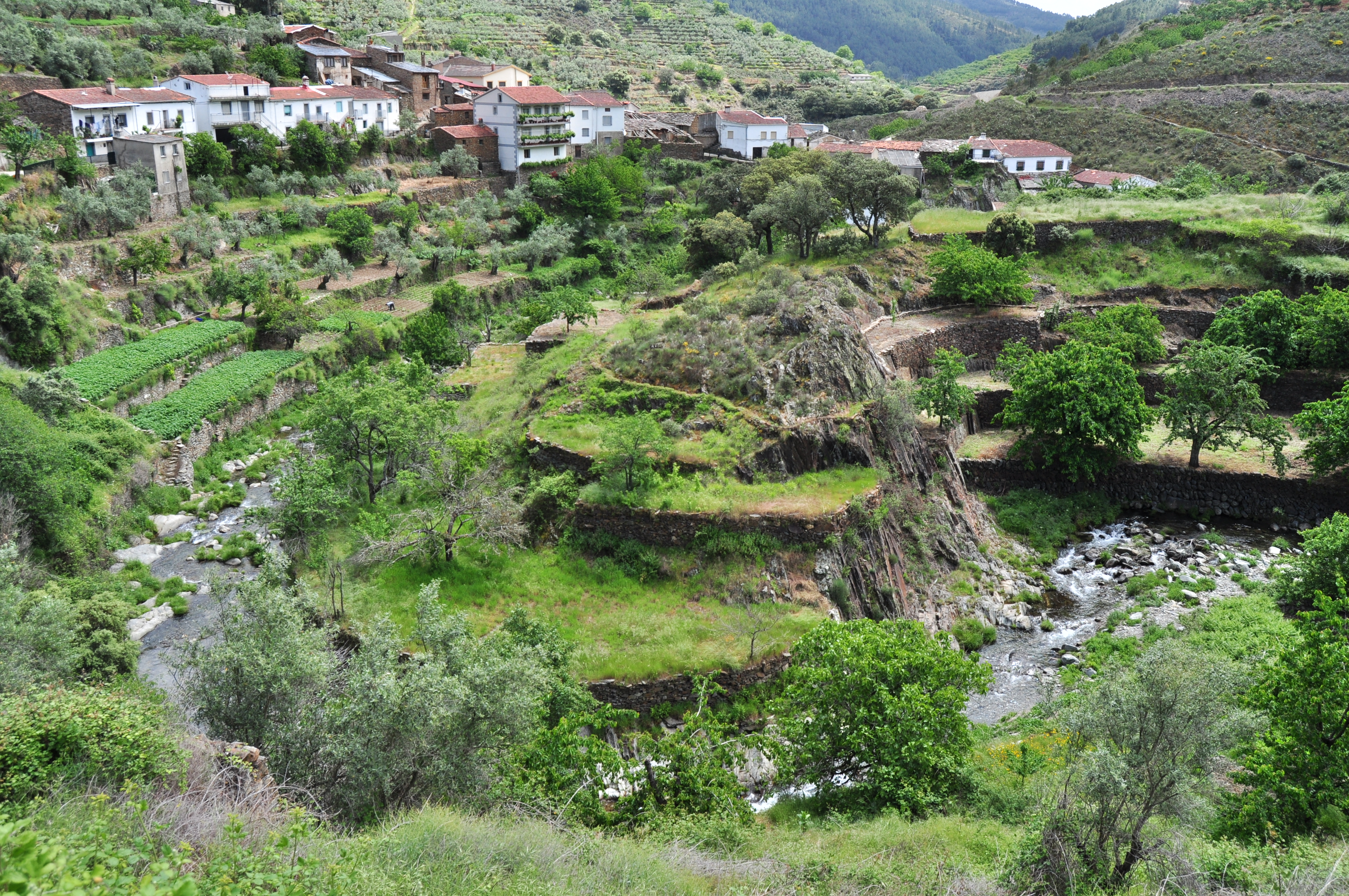

- Location within Extremadura Location within Spain
- Coordinates: 40°26′29″N 6°18′0″W
- Country: Spain
- Autonomous community: Extremadura
- Province: Province of Cáceres
- Municipality: Casares de las Hurdes
- Elevation: 643 m (2,110 ft)

Population
  - Total: 22

Casarrubia is a hamlet and alqueria located in the municipality of Casares de las Hurdes, in Cáceres province, Extremadura, Spain. As of 2020, it has a population of 22.

== Geography ==
Casarrubia is located 185km north of Cáceres, Spain.
