= Aldehuela, Pinofranqueado =

Aldehuela
- Alqueria
- Location within Extremadura Location within Spain
- Coordinates: 40°22′57″N 6°23′20″W
- Country: Spain
- Autonomous community: Extremadura
- Province: Province of Cáceres
- Municipality: Pinofranqueado
- Elevation: 728 m (2,388 ft)

Population
  - Total: 17

Aldehuela is a hamlet and alqueria located in the municipality of Pinofranqueado, in Cáceres province, Extremadura, Spain. As of 2020, it has a population of 17.

== Geography ==
Aldehuela is located 145km north of Cáceres, Spain.
