= Avellana =

Avellana may refer to:

== People ==
- Andy Avellana, Filipino paratriathlete
- Daisy Avellana (1917–2013), Filipino stage actress and theater director
- Lamberto V. Avellana (1915–1991), Filipino film and stage director

== Other ==
- Collectio Avellana, collection of documents
- Fonte Avellana, Roman Catholic hermitage in Italy
- San Pietro Avellana, municipality in Italy

== See also ==
- Avellanar, in Spain
