= Ovejuela =

- Alqueria
- Location within Extremadura Location within Spain
- Coordinates: 40°18′42″N 6°26′20″W
- Country: Spain
- Autonomous community: Extremadura
- Province: Province of Cáceres
- Municipality: Pinofranqueado
- Elevation: 639 m (2,096 ft)

Population
  - Total: 73

Ovejuela is a hamlet and alqueria located in the municipality of Pinofranqueado, in Cáceres province, Extremadura, Spain. As of 2020, it has a population of 73.

== Geography ==
Ovejuela is located 137km north of Cáceres, Spain.
