= Cambrón, Cáceres =

Cambrón
- Alqueria
- Location within Extremadura Location within Spain
- Coordinates: 40°20′45″N 6°15′36″W
- Country: Spain
- Autonomous community: Extremadura
- Province: Province of Cáceres
- Municipality: Caminomorisco
- Elevation: 542 m (1,778 ft)

Population
  - Total: 22

Cambrón is a hamlet and alqueria located in the municipality of Caminomorisco, in Cáceres province, Extremadura, Spain. As of 2020, it has a population of 22.

== Geography ==
Cambrón is located 144km north of Cáceres, Spain.
