= Robledo, Casares de las Hurdes =

Robledo
- Alqueria
- Location within Extremadura Location within Spain
- Coordinates: 40°26′51″N 6°17′31″W
- Country: Spain
- Autonomous community: Extremadura
- Province: Province of Cáceres
- Municipality: Casares de las Hurdes
- Elevation: 884 m (2,900 ft)

Population
  - Total: 32

Robledo is a village and alqueria located in the municipality of Casares de las Hurdes, in Cáceres province, Extremadura, Spain. As of 2020, it has a population of 32.

== Geography ==
Robledo is located 185km north of Cáceres, Spain.
