= Muela, Pinofranqueado =

Muela
- Alqueria
- Location within Extremadura Location within Spain
- Coordinates: 40°18′40″N 6°19′47″W
- Country: Spain
- Autonomous community: Extremadura
- Province: Province of Cáceres
- Municipality: Pinofranqueado
- Elevation: 475 m (1,558 ft)

Population
  - Total: 63

Muela is a hamlet and alqueria located in the municipality of Pinofranqueado, in Cáceres province, Extremadura, Spain. As of 2020, it has a population of 63.

== Geography ==
Muela is located 131km north of Cáceres, Spain.
