= Casa de la Sirena =

Casa de la Serena
- Casa de la Sirena
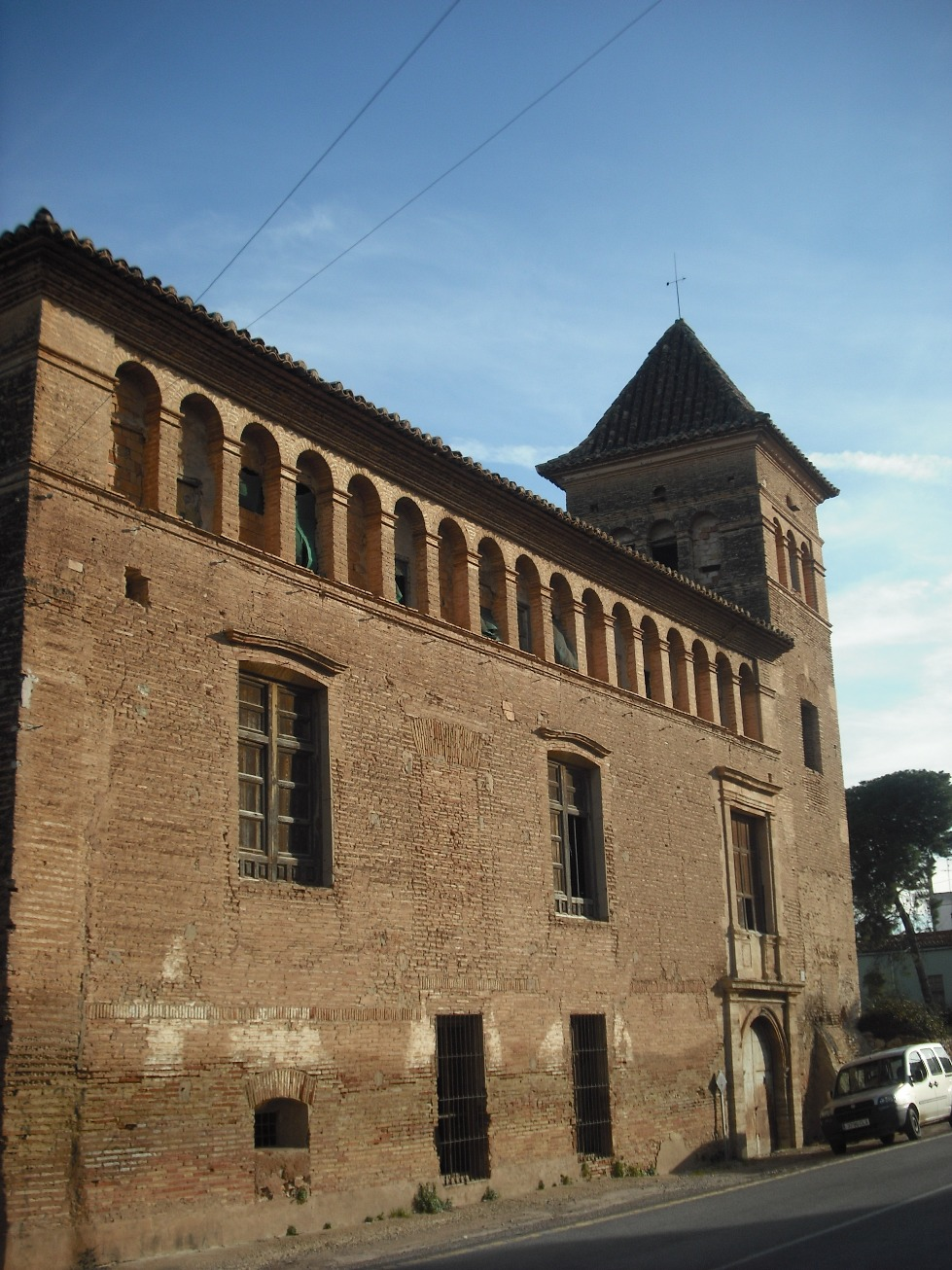
- Casa de la Serena viewed from the north
- Interactive map of the Casa de la Serena area

General information
- Type: Palace
- Architectural style: Renaissance, Baroque
- Location: Alfara del Patriarca, Valencia, Spain
- Coordinates: 39°31′51″N 0°23′06″W
- Construction started: 16th century

Design and construction
- Designations: Bien de Interés Cultural (2004)

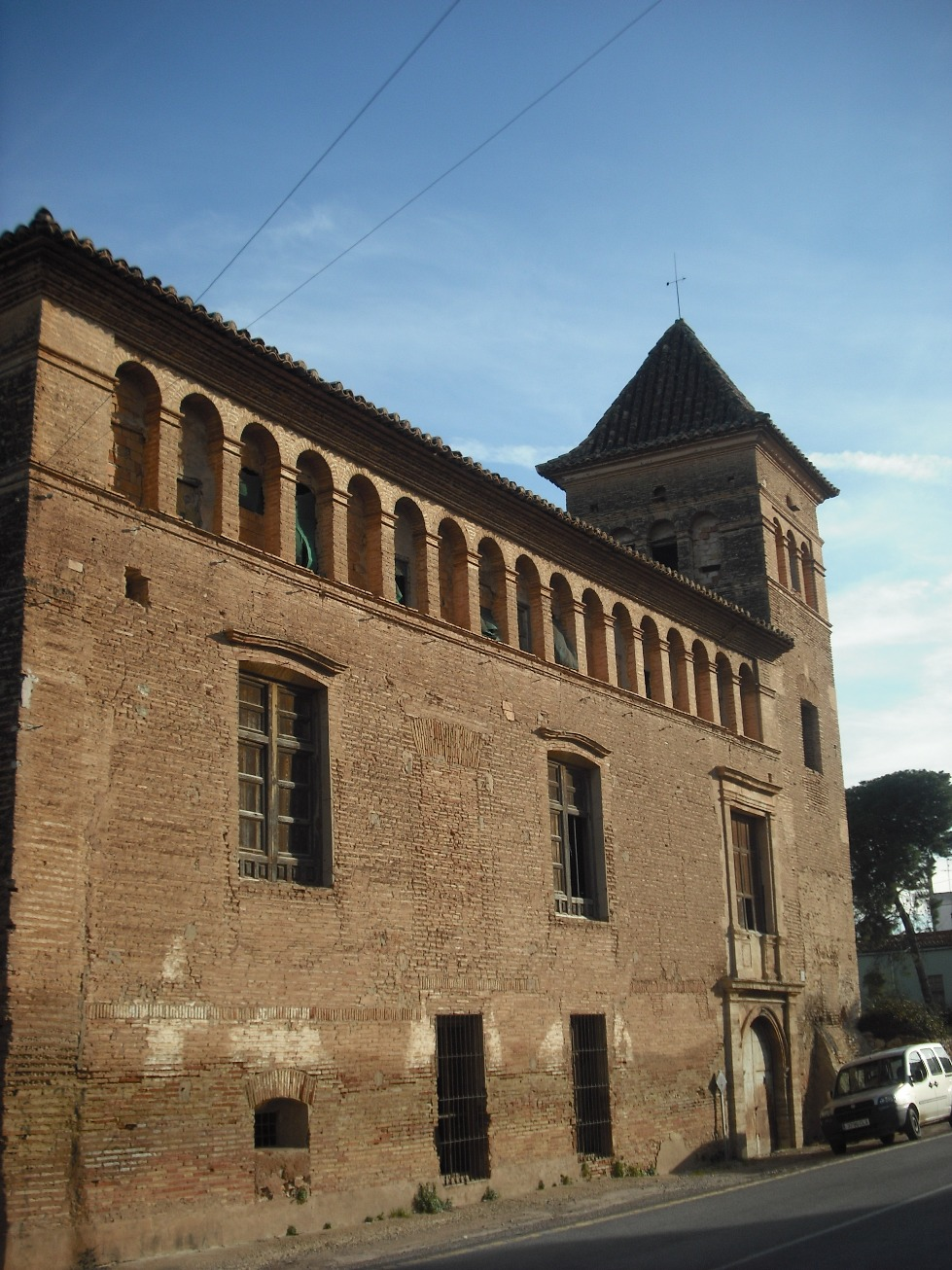
Casa de la Serena viewed from the north

The Casa de la Serena, also known as Casa de la Sirena, Casa de la Torre or Casa de los Ferragud, is a Renaissance and Baroque manor palace located in the Valencian orchard, in the municipality of Alfara del Patriarca, bordering the neighbouring urban area of Benifaraig, in the province of Valencia, Spain. It was declared a Bien de Interés Cultural (Asset of Cultural Interest) in 2004. The building is a residential palace of Renaissance and Baroque styles, constructed between the 16th and 18th centuries. Its name derives from the figure surrounding its noble coat of arms — a creature with the head of a woman and the body of a serpent, dating from 1553 according to an inscription on the shield.

The building is currently abandoned and in need of restoration, and is included in the Red List of Endangered Heritage.

== Description ==
The Casa de la Serena is a rural palace that served the dual function of an agricultural farmstead and a seigniorial leisure villa. This dual purpose gives it the distinctive characteristic of incorporating urban residential features, such as placing its main facade and entrance directly onto the road from Benifaraig to Alfara.

The complex, consisting of the main house and outbuildings, is one of the few surviving examples of 16th-century palatial architecture in a rural setting. It combines new floor plan schemes and compositional themes influenced by Mannerism with classicist elements. During the 18th century, the building underwent further intervention, resulting in the opening of large windows on the main and interior facades, the blocking of others, and the addition of a pointed four-slope roof over the tower.

The architectural scheme is more complex than the preceding seigniorial farmhouses of medieval tradition. The courtyard functions simultaneously as an access space, a working area, and a transitional nucleus between the street and the palace a combination of both the Gothic farmhouse and the Gothic palace typologies.

The floor plan of the main building consists of a double bay on two sides of the courtyard, with two construction bodies built from load-bearing walls parallel to the facade. Access to the main residence on the upper floor is through a door at the base of the tower, which leads to the staircase.

The tower is located at one end of the building and has considerable volumetric independence. It rises high enough to open openings on all facades. A Flemish-influenced roof caps the tower, emphasising its slenderness. A gallery crowns the plain brickwork and supports a prominent eave that defines the volume.
