= Caminomorisco =

Coordinates: 40°19′N 6°17′W

Caminomorisco, Spain
- municipality
- Flag Coat of arms

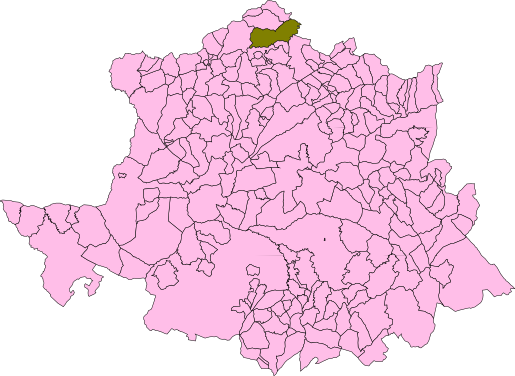
- Country: Spain
- Autonomous community: Extremadura
- Province: Cáceres
- Municipality: Caminomorisco

Government
  - Alcaldesa: María Soledad Gómez Sánchez

Area
  - Total: 147.6 km^{2} (57.0 sq mi)
- Elevation: 491 m (1,611 ft)

Population (2025-01-01)
  - Total: 1,097
  - Density: 7.432/km^{2} (19.25/sq mi)
- Time zone: UTC+1 (CET)
  - Summer (DST): UTC+2 (CEST)
- Climate: Csa

Caminomorisco, locally known as Caminomoriscu, is a municipality located in Las Hurdes, province of Cáceres, Extremadura, Spain. According to the 2006 census (INE), the municipality has a population of 1292 inhabitants, which are known as morisqueños.

== History ==
This town was formerly known as Las Calabazas and its present name dates back to the beginning of the 20th century. The area has known much depopulation during the last few decades, so that a number of alquerías (small settlements of a few houses), like Casas de Jelechoso, Arrocartintero and Arrocerezo, lie now abandoned.

A number of archaeological discoveries have been made around Caminomorisco, in Arrocerezo, Vamesto, Cugoso, Los Tesitos and La Coronita; the finds include ancient Iberian petroglyphs (ídolos-placa), prehistoric steles (ídolos-estela) and other smaller inscribed stones. There are also remains from Roman times in El Alcornocal, La Cebaílla, Valle Clara, Los Tesoros and El Minuero.

== Alquerías ==
The following alquerías are within Caminomorisco's municipal limits (traditional name variants are in brackets):

- Aceña (L’Aceña)
- Arrocerezo (Arrocerezu)
- Arrofranco (Arrofrancu)
- Arrolobos (Arrolobus)
- Cambrón
- Cambroncino (Cambroncinu)
- Dehesilla (La Jesilla)
- Huerta (La Güerta, pronounced "La Gwerta")
- Riomalo de Abajo (Riomalu d’Abaju)

== See also ==
- Las Hurdes
- List of municipalities in Cáceres
