= Pinofranqueado =

- Municipality
- Coat of arms

- Location of Pinofranqueado in Extremadura Location of Pinofranqueado in Spain.
- Coordinates: 40°18′14″N 6°19′53″W
- Country: Spain
- Autonomous community: Extremadura
- Province: Cáceres
- Comarca: Las Hurdes

Government
  - Alcalde: José Antonio Caldoria Gómez

Area
  - Total: 148 km^{2} (57 sq mi)
- Elevation: 760 m (2,490 ft)

Population (2025-01-01)
  - Total: 1,783
  - Density: 12.0/km^{2} (31.2/sq mi)
- Time zone: UTC+1 (CET)
  - Summer (DST): UTC+2 (CEST)
- Climate: Csa

Pinofranqueado, locally known as Pinofranqueáu, is a municipality located in Las Hurdes, province of Cáceres, Extremadura, Spain. According to the 2005 census (INE), the municipality has a population of 1651 inhabitants.

== Royal visit ==
King Juan Carlos and Queen Sofia visited Pinofranqueado in April 1998, the first royal visit to Las Hurdes since 1922. In his speech the king praised the Hurdanos for having overcome the miseries and illnesses of the past.

== Alquerías ==
The following alquerías (small settlements of a few houses) are within the municipal limits of Pinofranqueado (traditional name variants are in brackets):

- Aldehuela (L’Aldegüela, pronounced "laldegwela")
- Avellanar (L’Avellanal)
- Castillo (El Castillu)
- Las Erías
- Horcajo (Horcaju)
- Mesegal
- El Moral
- Muela (La Muela)
- Ovejuela
- Robledo (Robréu)
- Sauceda (Saucea or Lasocea)

== See also ==
- List of municipalities in Cáceres
