= Ladrillar =

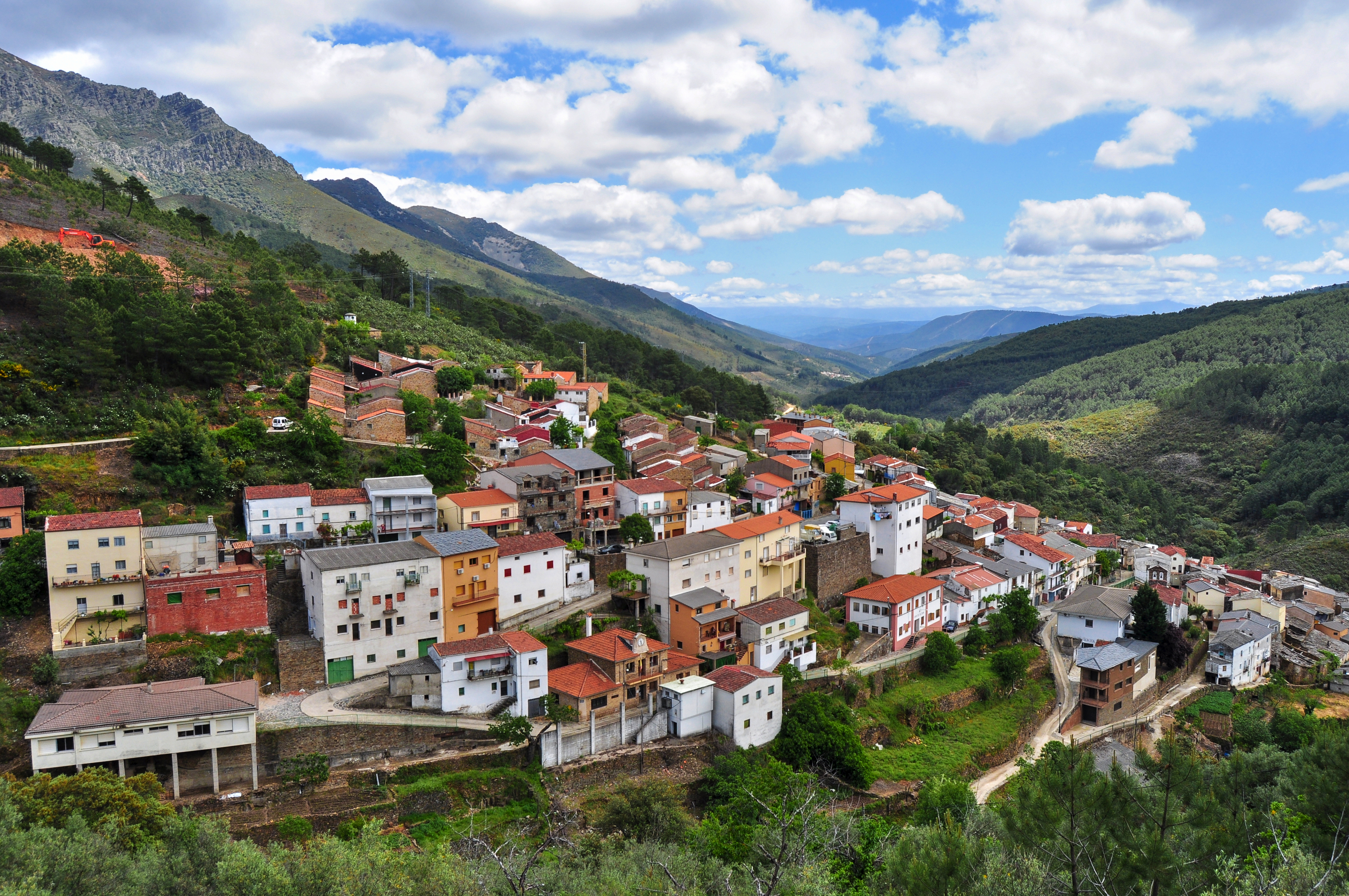
- Panoramic view of Ladrillar

- Coat of arms

- Location of Ladrillar in Extremadura Location of Ladrillarin Spain.
- Coordinates: 40°22′N 6°03′W
- Country: Spain
- Autonomous community: Extremadura
- Province: Cáceres
- Comarca: Las Hurdes

Government
  - Alcalde: Inocencio San Nazario Iglesias

Area
  - Total: 53 km^{2} (20 sq mi)
- Elevation: 784 m (2,572 ft)

Population (2025-01-01)
  - Total: 177
  - Density: 3.3/km^{2} (8.6/sq mi)
- Time zone: UTC+1 (CET)
  - Summer (DST): UTC+2 (CEST)

Ladrillar, also known by its Extremaduran name Lairillal, is a municipality located in Las Hurdes, province of Cáceres, Extremadura, Spain. According to the 2006 census (INE), the municipality has a population of 234 inhabitants.

== Alquerías ==
The following alquerías (hamlets) are within the municipal limits of Ladrillar (traditional variants of the name are in brackets):

- Cabezo (Cabezu)
- Las Mestas, located in the lower part of the Valle de Las Batuecas, at the confluence of the Batuecas River and the Ladrillar River, it belongs geographically to the Las Batuecas region, even though it is historically part of Las Hurdes.
- Riomalo de Arriba (Riomalu d’Arriba)

== History ==
According to old documents Ladrillar was formerly named "El Adrial". In former times the seat of the municipality was in the El Cabezo alquería and Ladrillar was part of the Nuñomoral area. People of Ladrillar are affectionately known to the locals of other nearby villages as "Veleguines", which means nervous, restless persons.

== See also ==
- Las Hurdes
- List of municipalities in Cáceres
