= Casares de las Hurdes =

- Municipality
- Flag Coat of arms

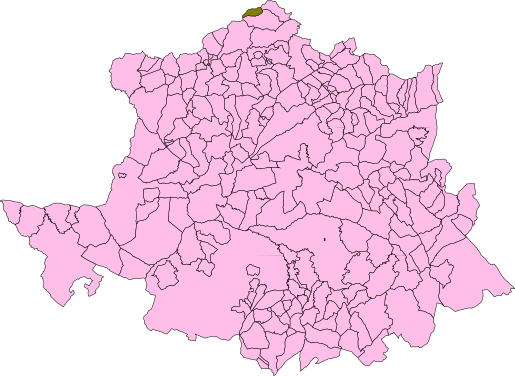
- Location of Casares de las Hurdes in Cáceres Province

- Location of Casares de las Hurdes in Extremadura Location of Casares de las Hurdes in Spain.
- Coordinates: 40°26′25″N 6°17′18″W
- Country: Spain
- Autonomous community: Extremadura
- Province: Cáceres
- Comarca: Las Hurdes

Government
  - Alcalde: Olegario Rodríguez Sánchez

Area
  - Total: 20 km^{2} (7.7 sq mi)
- Elevation: 1,110 m (3,640 ft)

Population (2025-01-01)
  - Total: 362
  - Density: 18/km^{2} (47/sq mi)
- Time zone: UTC+1 (CET)
  - Summer (DST): UTC+2 (CEST)

Casares de las Hurdes (Casaris in extremaduran), is a municipality located in Las Hurdes, province of Cáceres, Extremadura, Spain. According to the 2006 census (INE), the municipality has a population of 582 inhabitants. The town is famous for its drummers (tamborilerus).

== First royal visit to Las Hurdes ==
Historical population
Year	Pop.	±%
2001	701	—
2002	649	−7.4%
2003	650	+0.2%
2004	619	−4.8%
2005	592	−4.4%
2006	582	−1.7%

King Alfonso XIII visited Las Hurdes in 1922 in order to display the concern of the crown for this remote area. Physician and writer Gregorio Marañón accompanied the young king as guide. The king and his retinue lived in military tents planted near Casares de las Hurdes.

During the king's visit a strange incident took place: A local village chief, concerned that the king was drinking only black coffee (a consequence of the king's aides distrusting the quality of the local milk owing to unsanitary conditions in the area) served the king a small jug of milk saying, "Your Majesty rest assured that this milk is totally trustworthy," which turned out to be from his wife who had recently given birth. The king became aware of this fact only after having had his café con leche.

== Hamlets ==
The following alquerías (small settlements of a few houses) are within Casares de las Hurdes' municipal limits (extremaduran names are in brackets):

- Carabusino (Carabusinu)
- Casarrubia (Jurdi)
- Heras (Las Heras)
- Huetre (La Güetri, pronounced "gwetri")
- Robledo (Robréu)

== See also ==
- List of municipalities in Cáceres
