= Las Mestas, Extremadura =

Las Mestas
- Alqueria
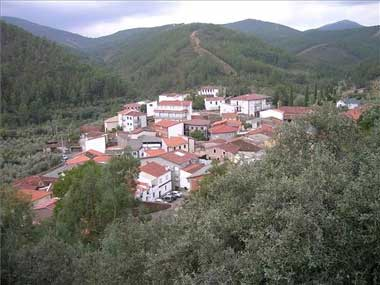

- Location within Extremadura Location within Spain
- Coordinates: 40°25′32″N 6°8′46″W
- Country: Spain
- Autonomous community: Extremadura
- Province: Province of Cáceres
- Municipality: Ladrillar
- Elevation: 474 m (1,555 ft)

Population
  - Total: 43

Las Mestas is a hamlet and alqueria located in the municipality of Ladrillar, in Cáceres province, Extremadura, Spain. As of 2020, it has a population of 43.

== Geography ==
Las Mestas is located 165km north-northeast of Cáceres, Spain.
