= Cambroncino =

- Alqueria
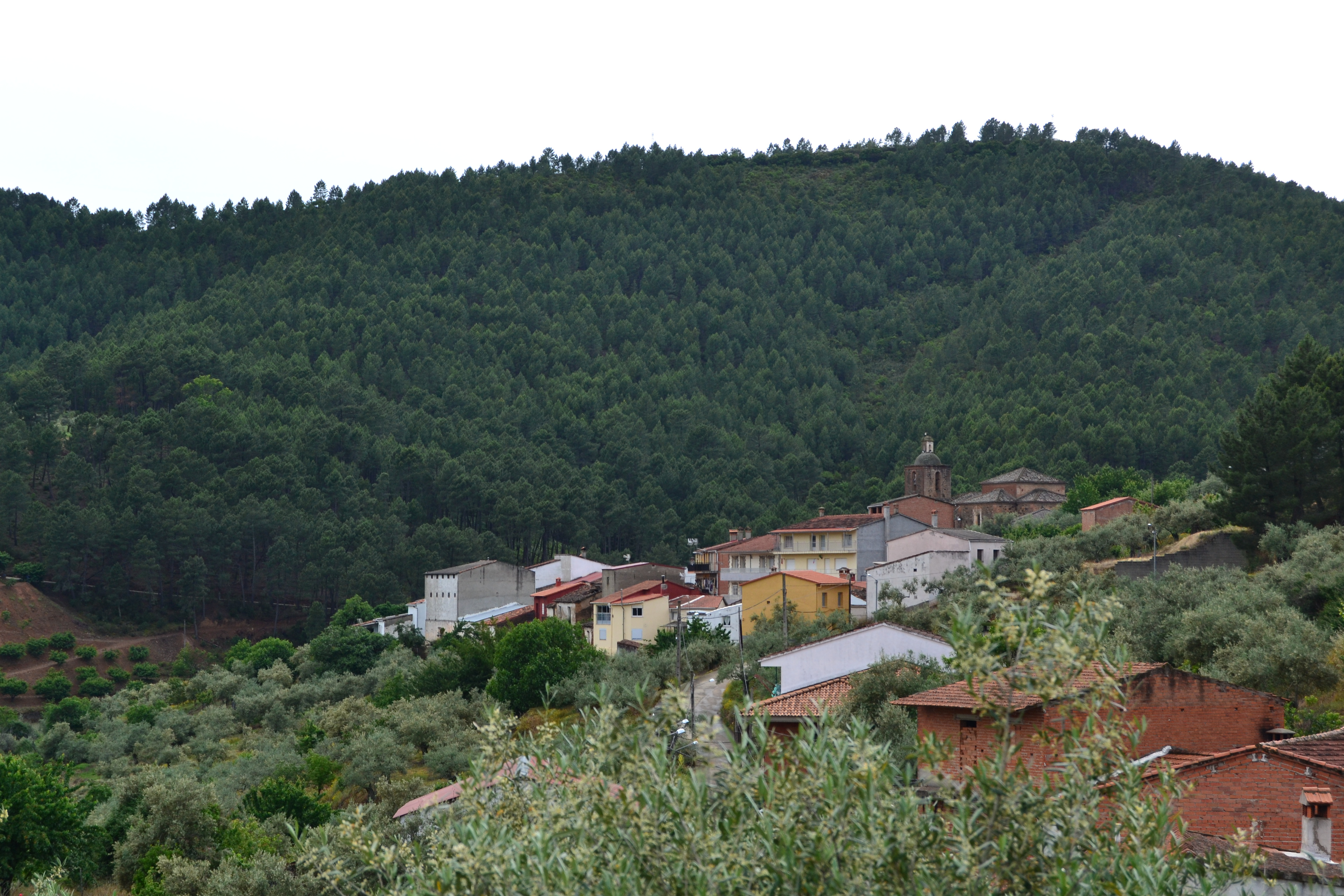

- Location within Extremadura Location within Spain
- Coordinates: 40°20′36″N 6°13′59″W
- Country: Spain
- Autonomous community: Extremadura
- Province: Province of Cáceres
- Municipality: Caminomorisco
- Elevation: 483 m (1,585 ft)

Population
  - Total: 207

Cambroncino is a village and alqueria located in the municipality of Caminomorisco, in Cáceres province, Extremadura, Spain. As of 2020, it has a population of 207.

== Geography ==
Cambroncino is located 146km north of Cáceres.
