= Las Erías =

- Alqueria
- Erías
- Location within Extremadura Location within Spain
- Coordinates: 40°22′13″N 6°23′40″W
- Country: Spain
- Autonomous community: Extremadura
- Province: Province of Cáceres
- Municipality: Pinofranqueado
- Elevation: 637 m (2,090 ft)

Population
  - Total: 56

Las Erías or Erías is a hamlet and alqueria located in the municipality of Pinofranqueado, in Cáceres province, Extremadura, Spain. As of 2020, it has a population of 56.

== Geography ==
Las Erías is located 143km north of Cáceres, Spain.
