= Heras, Casares de las Hurdes =

Heras
- Alqueria
- Location within Extremadura Location within Spain
- Coordinates: 40°26′15″N 6°17′7″W
- Country: Spain
- Autonomous community: Extremadura
- Province: Province of Cáceres
- Municipality: Casares de las Hurdes
- Elevation: 630 m (2,070 ft)

Population
  - Total: 27

Heras is a hamlet and alqueria located in the municipality of Casares de las Hurdes, in Cáceres province, Extremadura, Spain. As of 2020, it has a population of 27.

== Geography ==
Heras is located 184km north of Cáceres, Spain.
