= Avellanar =

- Alqueria
- Location within Extremadura Location within Spain
- Coordinates: 40°21′41″N 6°20′24″W
- Country: Spain
- Autonomous community: Extremadura
- Province: Province of Cáceres
- Municipality: Pinofranqueado
- Elevation: 597 m (1,959 ft)

Population
  - Total: 14

Avellanar is a hamlet and alqueria located in the municipality of Pinofranqueado, in Cáceres province, Extremadura, Spain. As of 2020, it has a population of 14.

== Geography ==
Avellanar is located 139km north of Cáceres, Spain.
