= Antonio Erias =

Spanish politician

- Born: April 26, 1952 (age 74) oza, a Coruña
- Citizenship: Spanish
- Occupation: Economist

Academic background
- Education: University of Santiago de Compostela

Academic work
- Discipline: Economics
- Sub-discipline: Economic policy
- Institutions: Universidade da Coruña

Member of the Local Council of A Coruña
- In office 1999–2003
- Parliamentary group: People's Party (Spain)

First Vice President of Local Assembly of A Coruña (province)
- In office 1999–2003
- Parliamentary group: People's Party (Spain)

Member of Spanish Congress for A Coruña
- In office March 2004 – October 2014
- Parliamentary group: People's Party (Spain)

President of the Iberian Gas Market Operator
- Incumbent
- Assumed office November 2014

Personal details
- Party: People's Party (Spain)

Antonio Erias is a Spanish economist, university professor and politician. He is currently president and CEO of Mercado Ibérico del Gas (Mibgas), an Organised Gas Market operator or gas hub for the Iberian Peninsula.

== Early life and academic career ==
Erias was born in Vigo, Spain. He studied economics at Universidade de Santiago de Compostela, from which he graduated with a PhD. He later became professor at Universidade da Coruña, where he was also elected head of the department of applied economics and dean of the faculty of economics and business administration, staying in office from 1 June 1993 to 11 June 1999.

== Political career ==
Erias started his political career in the Spanish People's Party as candidate to mayor of the city of A Coruña in 1999. He was elected as a local councilor and became leader of the opposition. Soon thereafter he was elected first vice president of the local assembly of A Coruña (province), staying in office until the end of his local mandate in A Coruña in 2003. He then moved into national politics, and was a member of the Spanish Congress (lower house) for the province of A Coruña between 24 March 2004 and 23 October 2014. He resigned early to take up his newly created position of president and CEO of Mibgas, the Iberian gas market operator.
