= Azanites =

Ancient Greek physician

Azanites (Ancient Greek: Ἀζανίτης) was a physician of ancient Greece whose medical formulae appear to have enjoyed some celebrity, as they are quoted and praised by Galen, Oribasius, Aëtius of Amida, Paulus Aegineta, Heras of Cappadocia and others.

He is credited with creating medical preparations to deal with ulcers, wounds, and other diseases. As Galen is the earliest writer by whom he is mentioned, he must have lived some time in or before the second century CE. Some scholars put him around the 1st century BCE.
