= Heras (surname) =

Heras is a surname. Notable people with the surname include:

- Ángel Heras (born 1958), Spanish sprinter
- Francisco Manuel de las Heras y Borrero (1951–2013), Spanish historian
- Henry Heras (1888–1955), Spanish Jesuit priest, archaeologist, and historian
- Leo Heras, Mexican baseball player
- Roberto Heras (born 1974), Spanish cyclist
- Sol Heras (born 1987), English actor
