= Alqueria =

Country house with farmland, usually irrigated land

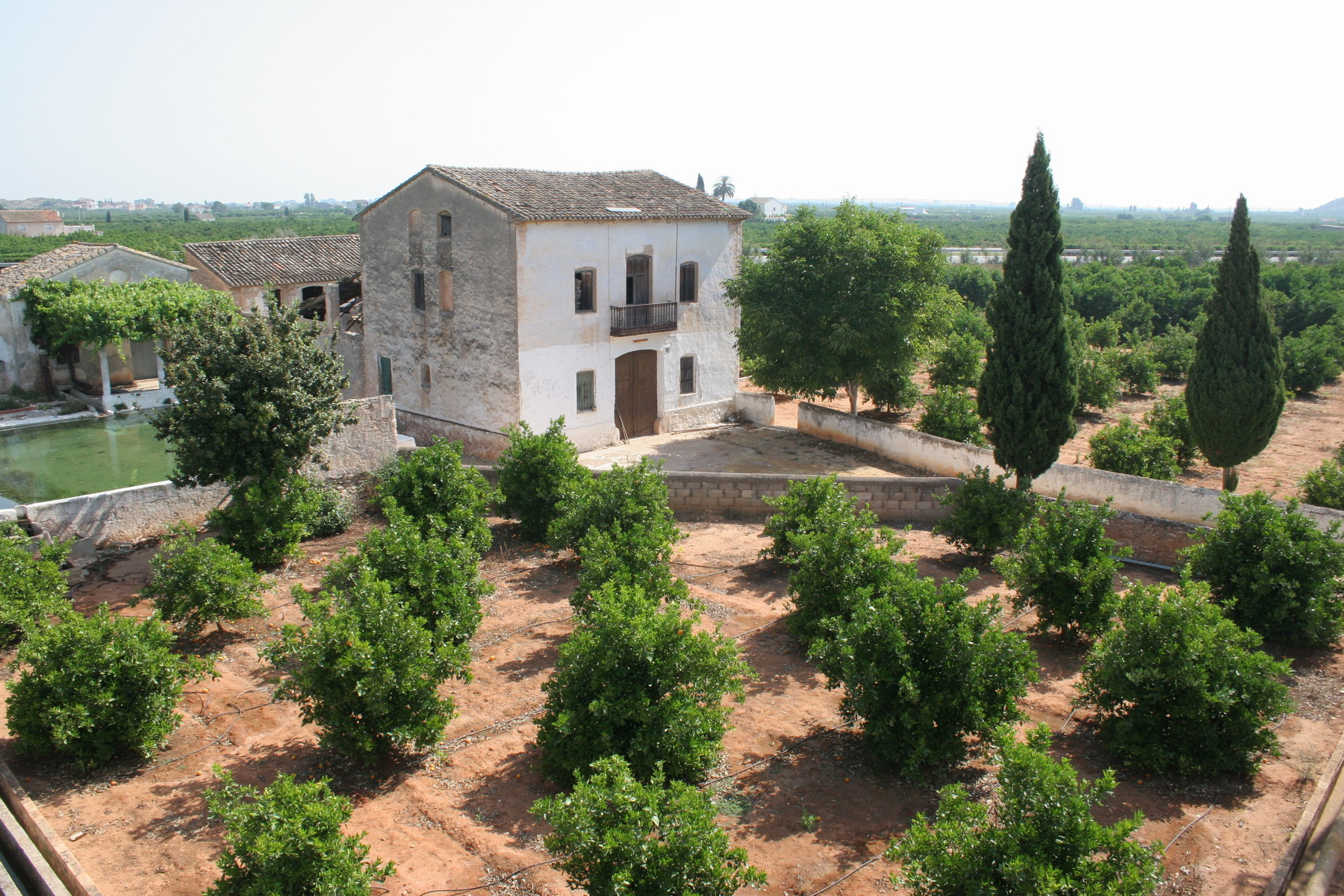
Alquería in the Horta region, Valencia.

An alquería (Spanish: [alkeˈɾi.a]; Valencian: alqueria [alkeˈɾi.a]; Portuguese: alcaria [alkɐˈɾi.ɐ]; from Arabic القرية al-qarīa, "village, hamlet") in Al-Andalus made reference to small rural communities that were located near cities (medinas). Since the 15th century it makes reference to a farmhouse, with an agricultural farm, found mainly in eastern and southeastern Spain, such as Granada and Valencia. Regarding the latter location Joan Fuster, in his book called El País Valenciano, makes extensive reference to the Valencian alquerías. Vestiges and documents referring to alquerias, known as alcarias in Portuguese, have been found in Portugal's southern region of Algarve. A number of places in southern and central Portugal have the word Alcaria in their name.

== History ==
An alquería is a small rural community formed by a few houses. The inhabitants were usually one or more families who made a living exploiting the surrounding lands, including farming and rearing livestock. The word alquería can be traced back to the 15th century. In the Horta of Valencia, where traditionally they have always been more plentiful, it is the corresponding dwelling to an important agricultural exploitation, usually on irrigated lands, unlike the hut, typical of the smallholding, and the masia, of cereal and livestock character. By the end of the Middle Ages this Andalusian farm fortress evolved into more modern forms, with a small palace-like look, inhabited by rural lords.

The lands to the west the Las Hurdes region in Extremadura was depopulated after the muslim conquest of the Iberian Peninsula in the 8th century, and the first vestiges of re-population in isolated compounds of a few dwellings or hamlets, locally known as alquerías, are dated around the end of the 12th century.

Many of the alquerías in the modern sense have disappeared. Some adopted different activities, such as mills or workshops, although many of them were abandoned through lack of use or depopulation. Moreover, in the urban expansionary policy, the alquerías are goods which are coveted in terms of the economic value that the greenfield that they occupy has. All this has implied that many of the alquerías that still exist are threatened with ruin. Some, of private property, have been restored as dwellings, usually as second residences, but they are not the most numerous ones. Due to the rise of the rural tourism, many of the rest ones have been adapted to the hotel trade as accommodations or restaurants, other cultural centers or museums.

== Typologies ==
=== Valencian alquerías ===
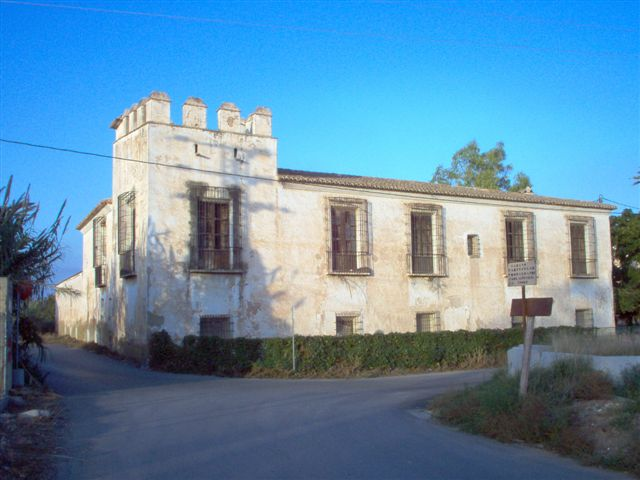
Alqueria del Moro, in Benicalap, Valencia.

In the typical Valencian alquería, the floor is a rectangle, which is sometimes joined with another perpendicular one, thus forming a right-angle; some other are formed by two squares, one recorded on the other. There are also farms with an irregular floor. Its elevation is almost always of a smooth façade. The door, which usually has an arch formed by an exact semicircle, can be non-arched. In the frontispiece or façade there are one or two rows of windows; the oldest ones used to have tribolados profiles which are divided by algimeces or mullions. On the ground floor there can be found what properly constitutes the housing, being especially noteworthy the studio or the double chamber. At the bottom of the ground floor we can find the home, with its large bell chimney. When there are two floors, the first may have rooms, which originally would be dedicated to the lords. The ordinary thing is the following: the only floor constitutes the sware, designed to save the harvests, and formerly for rearing silkworms. The cover of the alquerías have always Moorish tiles.

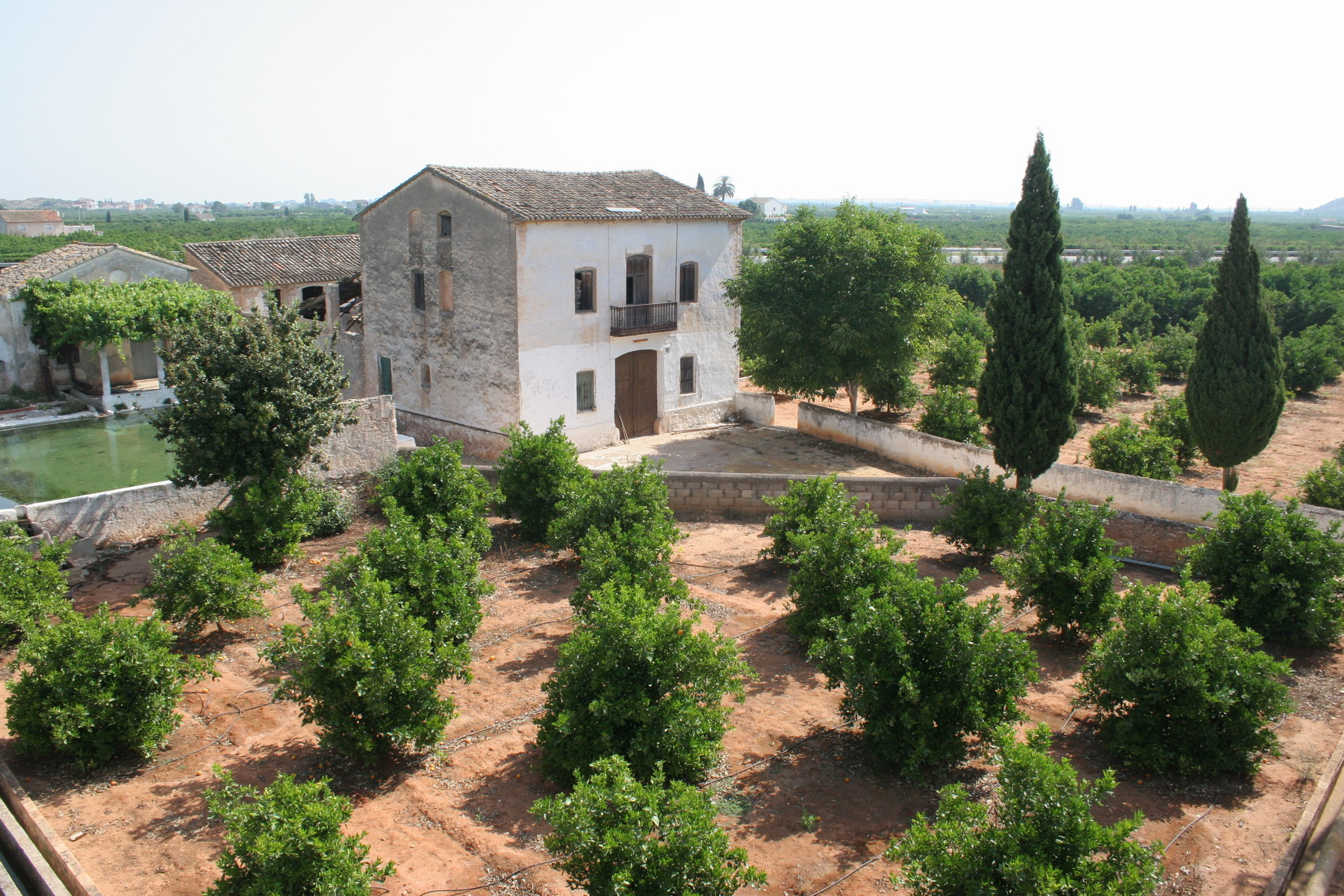
Alqueria at l'Horta de València

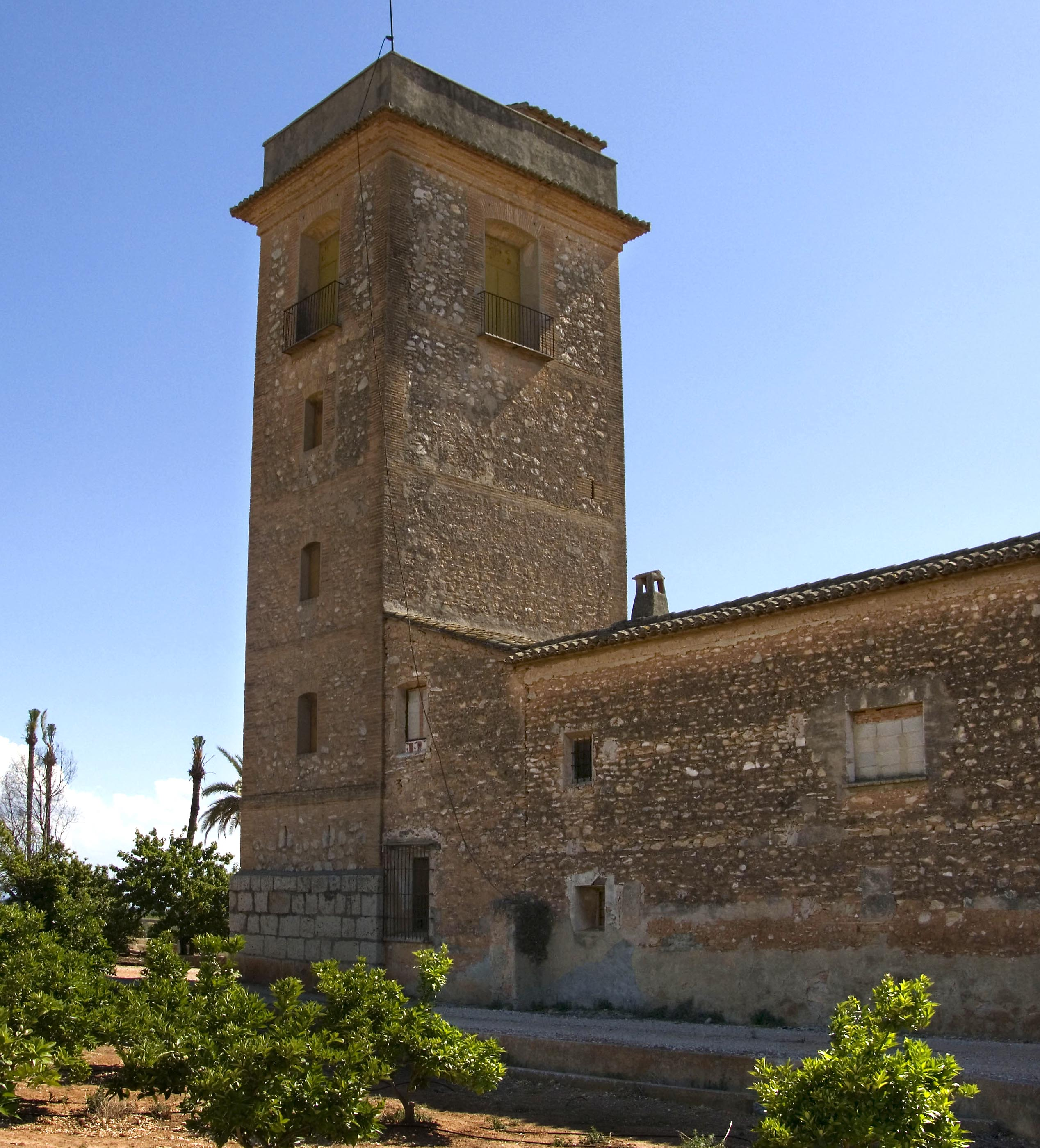
Alqueria Torre Borrero

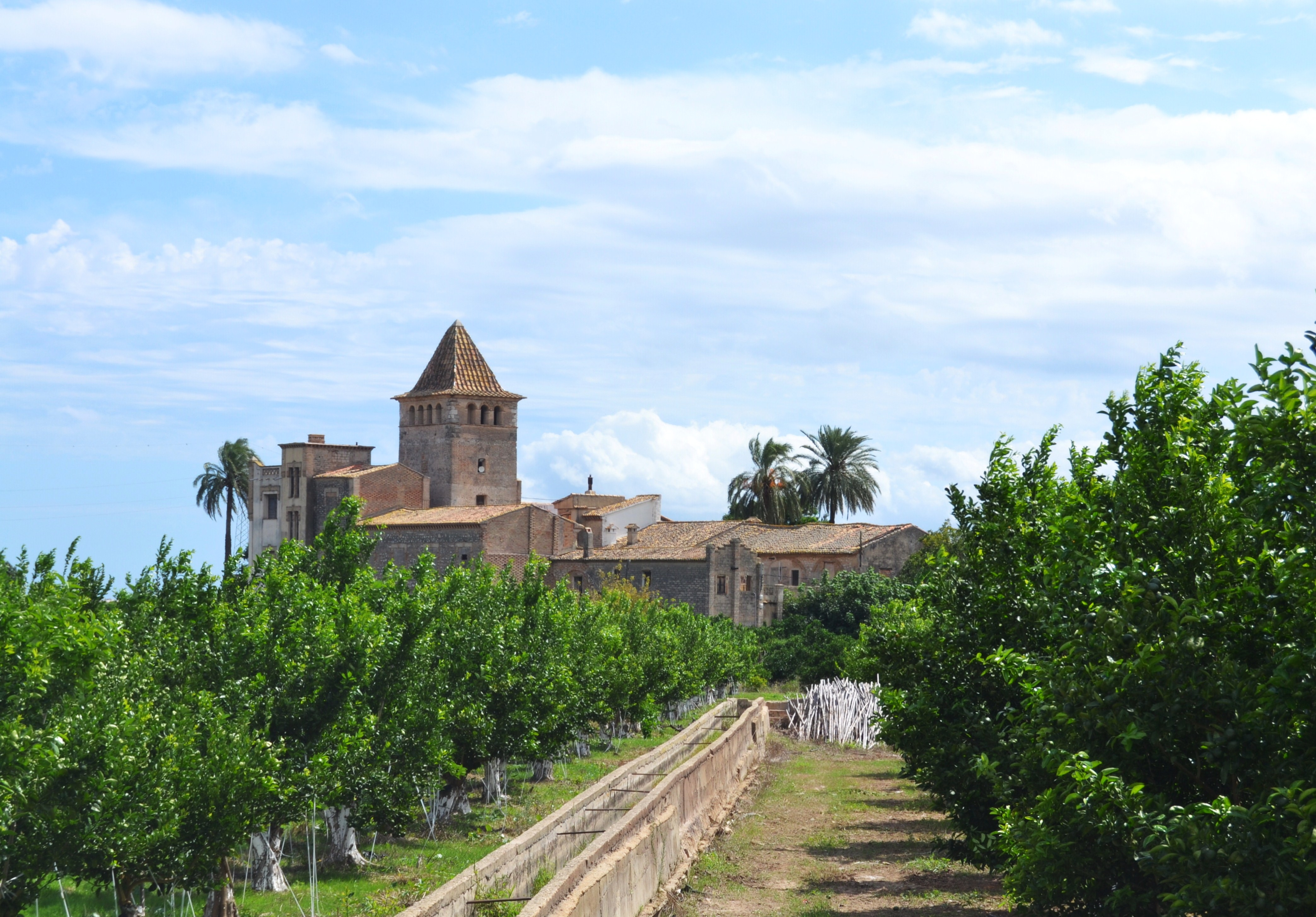
Alqueria fortificada Torre dels Pares

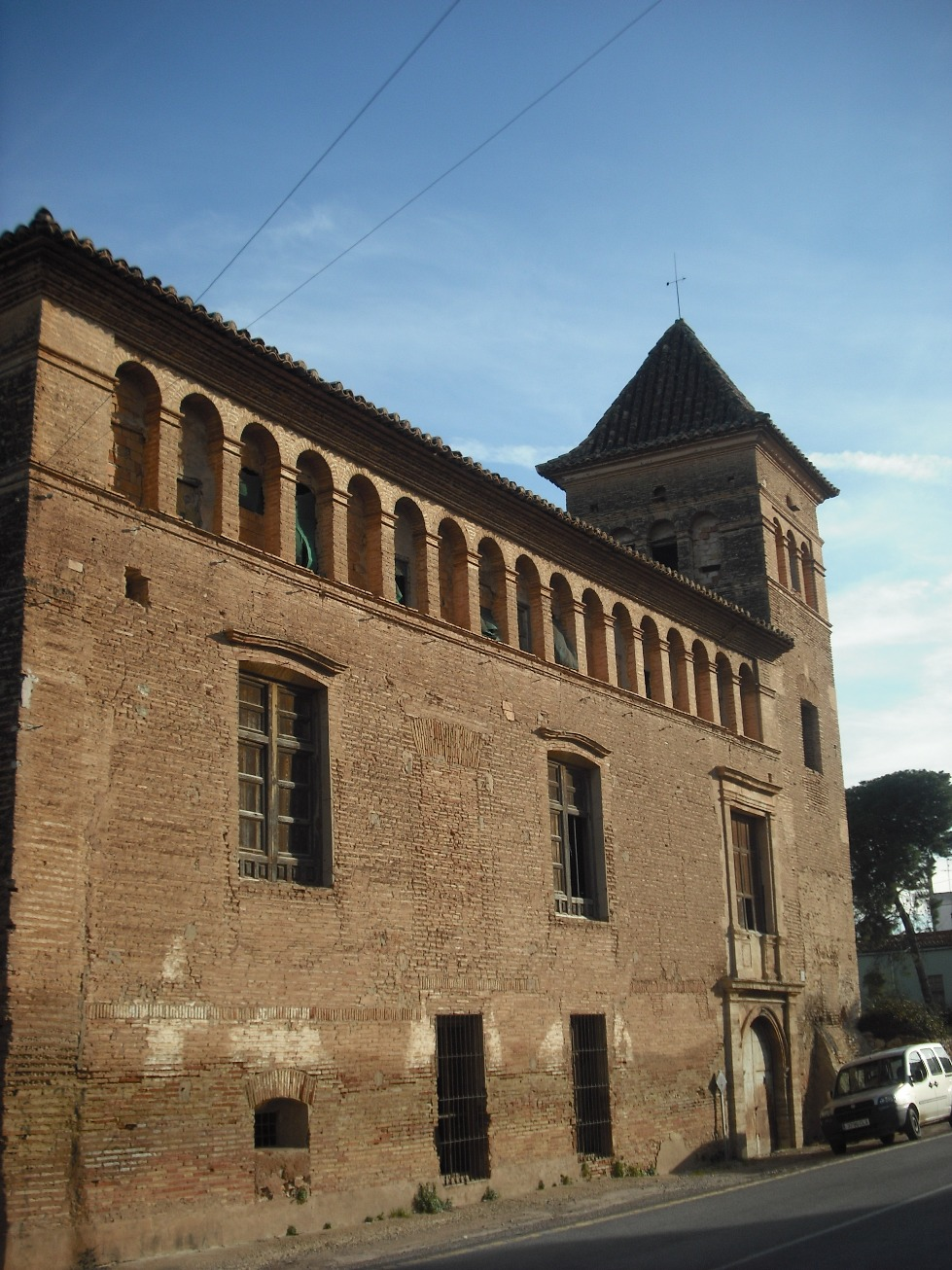
Casa de la Sirena

=== The alquerías of Granada ===
Some alquerías from Granada and other provinces of Eastern Andalusia have survived until nowadays. In the Alpujarras and the region of Guadix, they are currently being recovered for rural tourism, others were converted into farms or councils.

Others, however, were not that lucky and they disappeared as a result of the exodus to big cities.

== Companies using this name ==
Since this name is so characteristic of the Valencian land, many companies have adopted it for their trade names.

== See also ==
- Cortijo
