= Gasco =

Gasco may refer to:

- GASCO, an Abu Dhabi gas company
- GasCo, a subsidiary of Dynegy
- Egyptian Natural Gas Company
- FC Gasco, a Somali football club
- Gasco FC, an Egyptian football club; see 2014–15 Zamalek SC season
- General Aviation Safety Council (GASCo), a UK general aviation organization; see Guild of Air Traffic Control Officers
- Gasco (surname)

== See also ==
- Gasco Building (disambiguation)
- El Gascol, in Cáceres province, Extremadura, Spain
- Gassco, a Norwegian gas pipeline operator
