= El Escorial, Madrid =

El Escorial
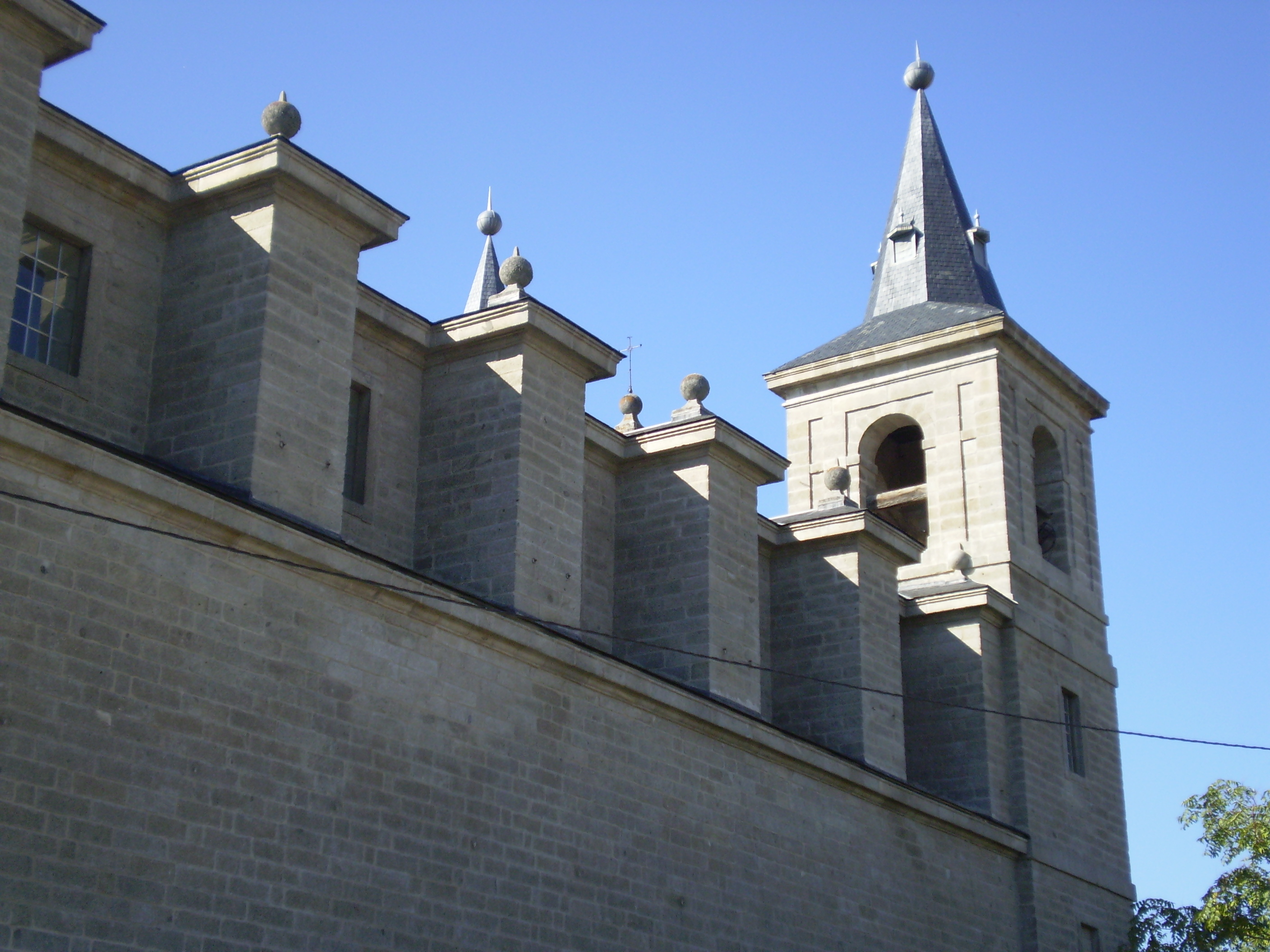
- Church of San Bernabé.

- Flag Coat of arms

- Location of El Escorial in Madrid

- Location in Spain
- Coordinates: 40°34′54″N 4°7′33″W
- Country: Spain
- Autonomous community: Community of Madrid
- Province: Madrid
- Comarca: Vegas de Coria

Government
  - Mayor: Antonio Vicente Rubio (PP)

Area
  - Total: 68.75 km^{2} (26.54 sq mi)
- Elevation: 909 m (2,982 ft)

Population (2025-01-01)
  - Total: 17,171
  - Density: 249.8/km^{2} (646.9/sq mi)
- Time zone: UTC+1 (CET)
  - Summer (DST): UTC+2 (CEST)
- Postal code: 28280
- Website: Official website

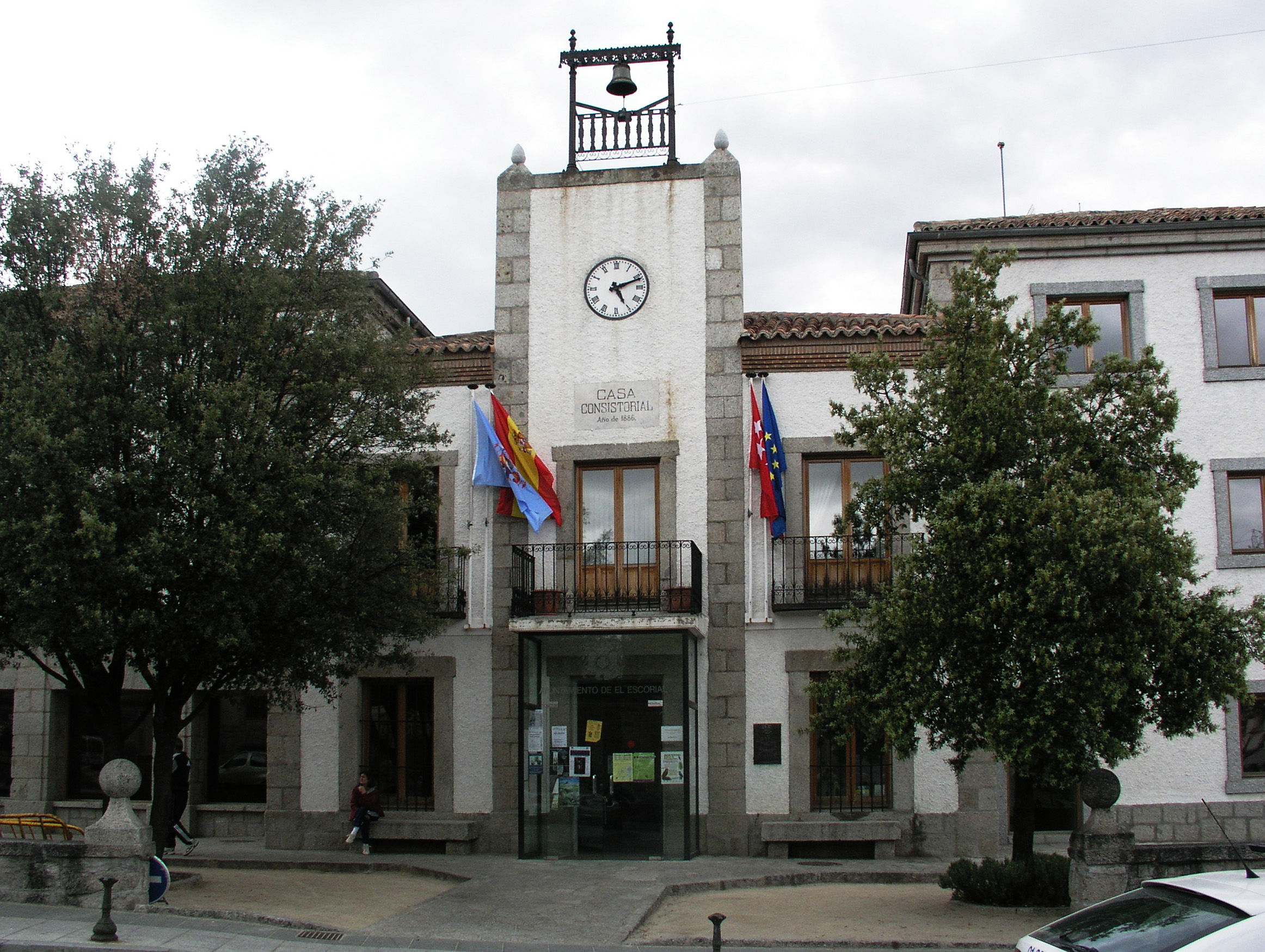
Casa constitorial

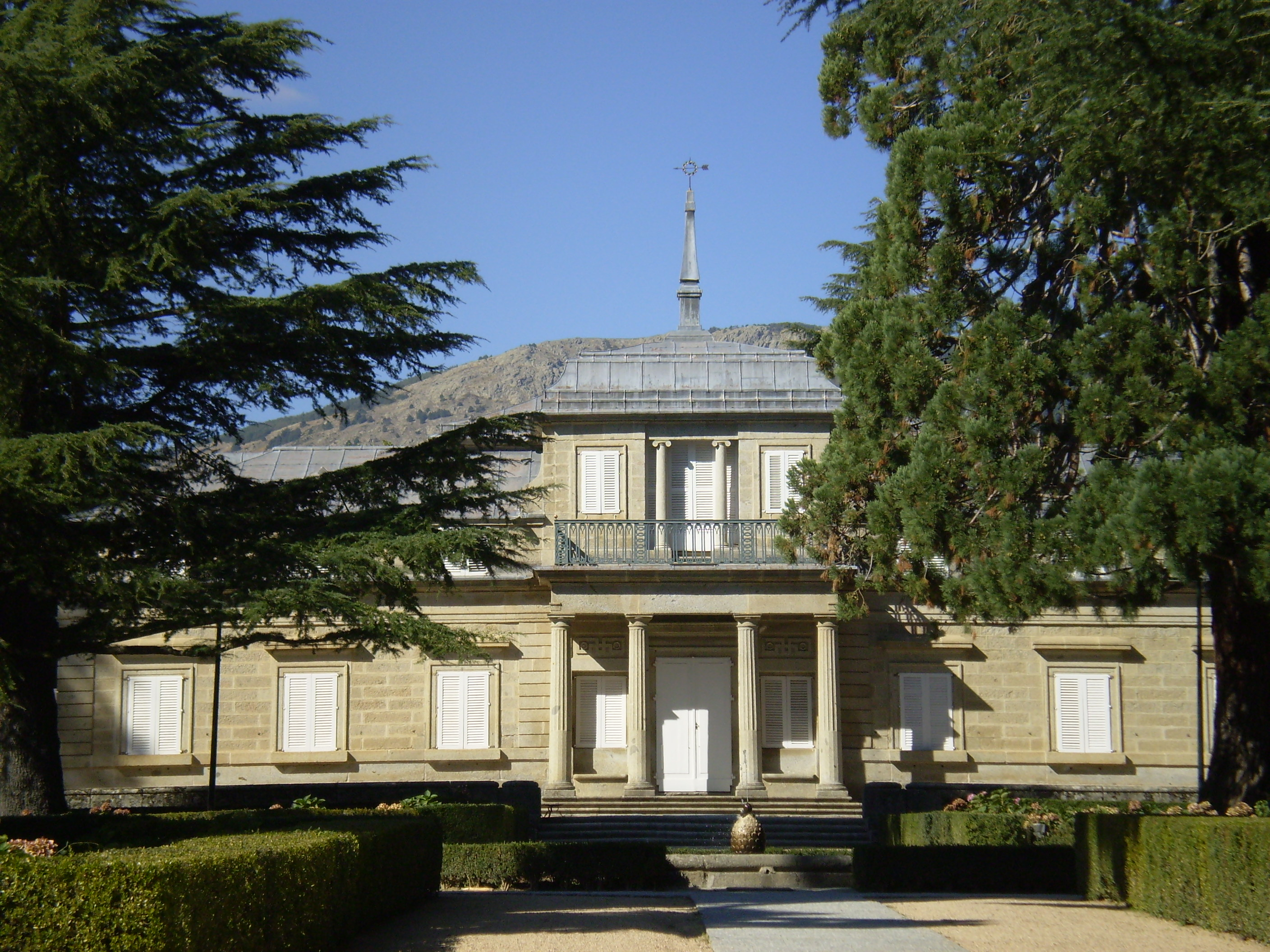
The Casita del Príncipe

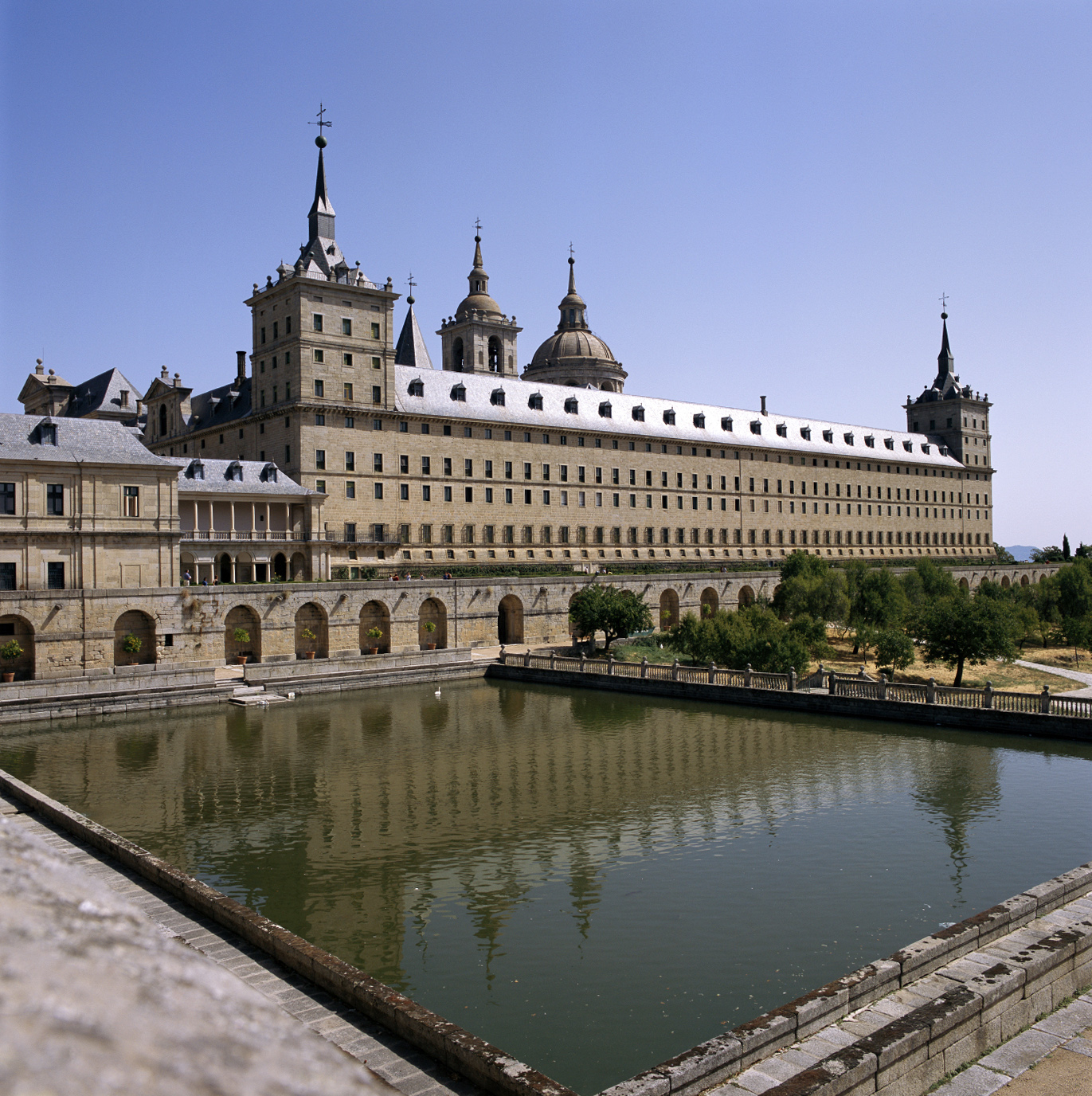
Monastery and Site of El Escorial

El Escorial is a municipality in the Autonomous Community of Madrid, located 45 km (28 mi) northwest of the Spanish capital Madrid. It belongs to the comarca of Cuenca del Guadarrama. Its population in 2009 was 14,979.

The territory of El Escorial is home to the park of La Granjilla de la Fresneda. The famous Royal Seat of San Lorenzo de El Escorial also known as Monasterio de El Escorial or El Escorial, is located in the adjacent municipality of San Lorenzo de El Escorial. On the outskirts of San Lorenzo de El Escorial is the national memorial Valle de los Caídos (Valley of the Fallen).

The name of the town derives from slag (escoria) deposits from an old local foundry.

== Main sights ==
- La Granjilla de La Fresneda, also known as La Fresneda and La Granjilla de La Fresneda de El Escorial, was a cottage of Philip II in the environment of the Monastery of El Escorial. La Granjilla was designed and constructed between 1561 and 1569, by Gaspar de Vega, Juan Bautista de Toledo, Juan de Herrera, Pedro de Tolosa, Fray Marcos de Cardona and Petre Janson. Situated at the foot of Mt. Abantos in the Sierra de Guadarrama, La Granjilla de La Fresneda, like El Escorial, is a multifunctional architectural complex: a place of woods, pastures and meadows with dams and artificial waterways, ponds and gardens; palace, chapel, tower, monastery for rest of the monks of El Escorial and granite boulders (e.g.: La Peña del Rey). It is located 5 km to the south-east of the Monastery of El Escorial and 3 km from the municipality of El Escorial on the M505.
- Church of St. Barnabas - based on the design of Francisco de Mora, constructed at the wish of King Philip II to replace an older church on the same site. Many expert stonemasons from the Monastery worked on its construction, cutting the granite from which its solid walls are built. The structure is notable for its simplicity and equilibrium, its harmony of line and proportion, and the almost total absence of ornamentation.
- Prestado monastery: residence of Philip II during the early years of the construction of the Monastery in San Lorenzo, the church was adapted for this use by adding new extensions and improving the existing structure. Construction was completed between 1567 and 1568. Later the building saw use as a hospital for workers on construction of the Monastery, and for making glass, from which the chimney is still visible.
- The House of the Prince (La Casita del Príncipe) - in neoclassical style, constructed between 1771 and 1775 and remodeled in 1781, under King Charles III by the architect Juan de Villanueva. It became the summer residence of the crown prince, the future Charles IV.
- Cross of Nefando - built on a rock in an interior garden of the Casita, in the first half of the 17th century
- Cross "del Tercio" - constructed in the 17th century, it marked the border between the neighborhoods of La Fresneda and Navalquejigo. Since 1985 it has stood at the center of a town square.
- Cross of Navaarmado - served to mark the boundary between La Fresneda and the urban center of El Escorial. The cross sits atop a large granite rock.
- Ark of St. Sebastian - from the mid-16th century, it served for the administration of water to the town. The walls are made of granite ashlars.

== Transportation ==
The municipality of El Escorial contains a Renfe commuter train station connecting the area to Madrid.

== Notable residents ==
L. Brent Bozell, Jr., the American conservative Catholic writer, moved his large family to the town in the mid-1960s as he became disillusioned with American politics and came to idealize Francoist Spain. He was joined by other likeminded Americans for a time, such as Reid Buckley, brother of conservative political columnist William F. Buckley Jr.

== See also ==
- Valle de los Caídos
- Imperial Route of the Community of Madrid
