= Cerezal (Nuñomoral) =

- Alqueria
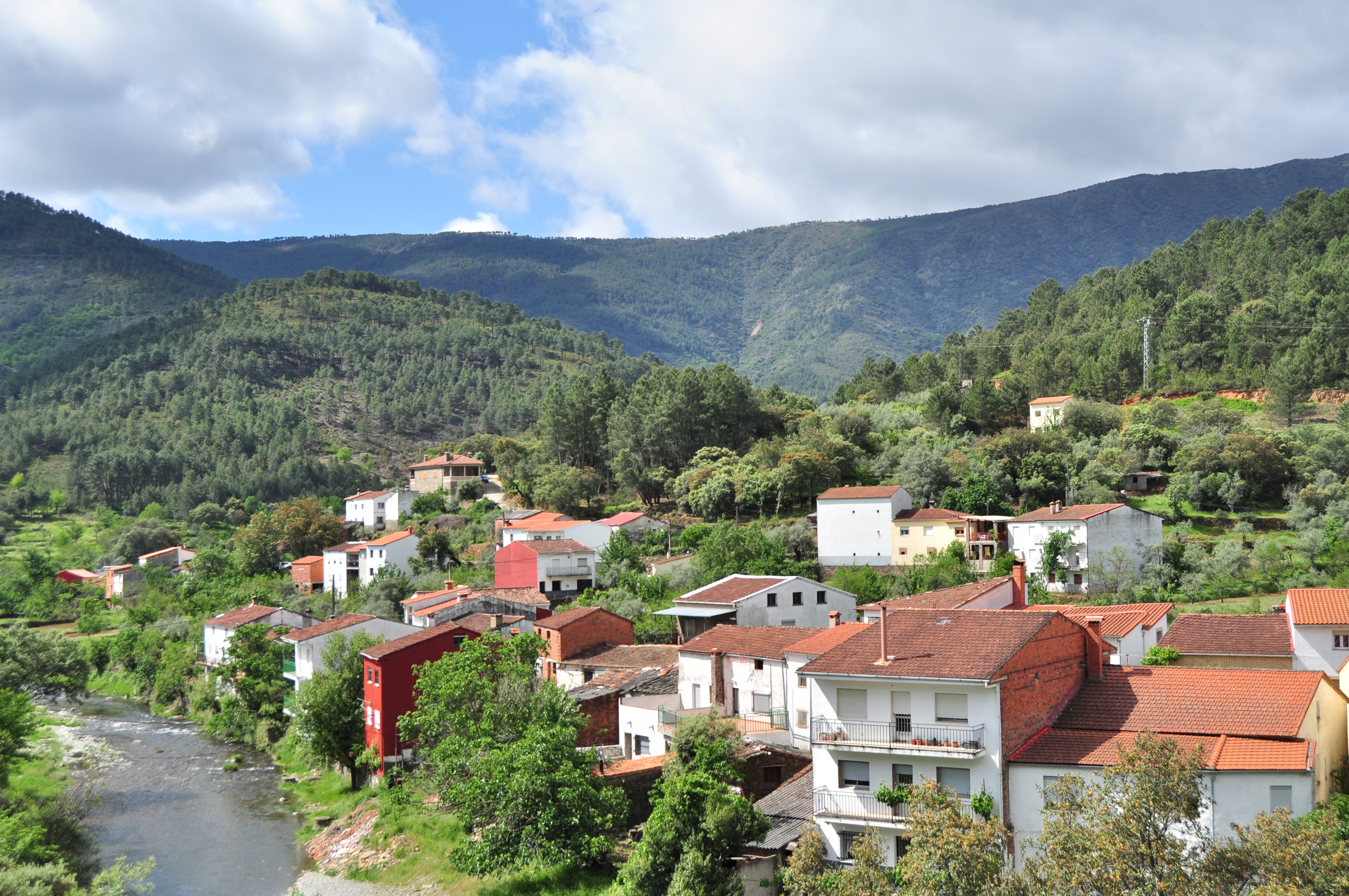

- Location within Extremadura Location within Spain
- Coordinates: 40°24′2″N 6°15′32″W
- Country: Spain
- Autonomous community: Extremadura
- Province: Province of Cáceres
- Municipality: Nuñomoral
- Elevation: 552 m (1,811 ft)

Population
  - Total: 128

Cerezal is a village and alqueria located in the municipality of Nuñomoral, in Cáceres province, Extremadura, Spain. As of 2020, it has a population of 128.

== Geography ==
Cerezal is located 179km north of Cáceres, Spain.
