= Martilandrán =

- Alqueria
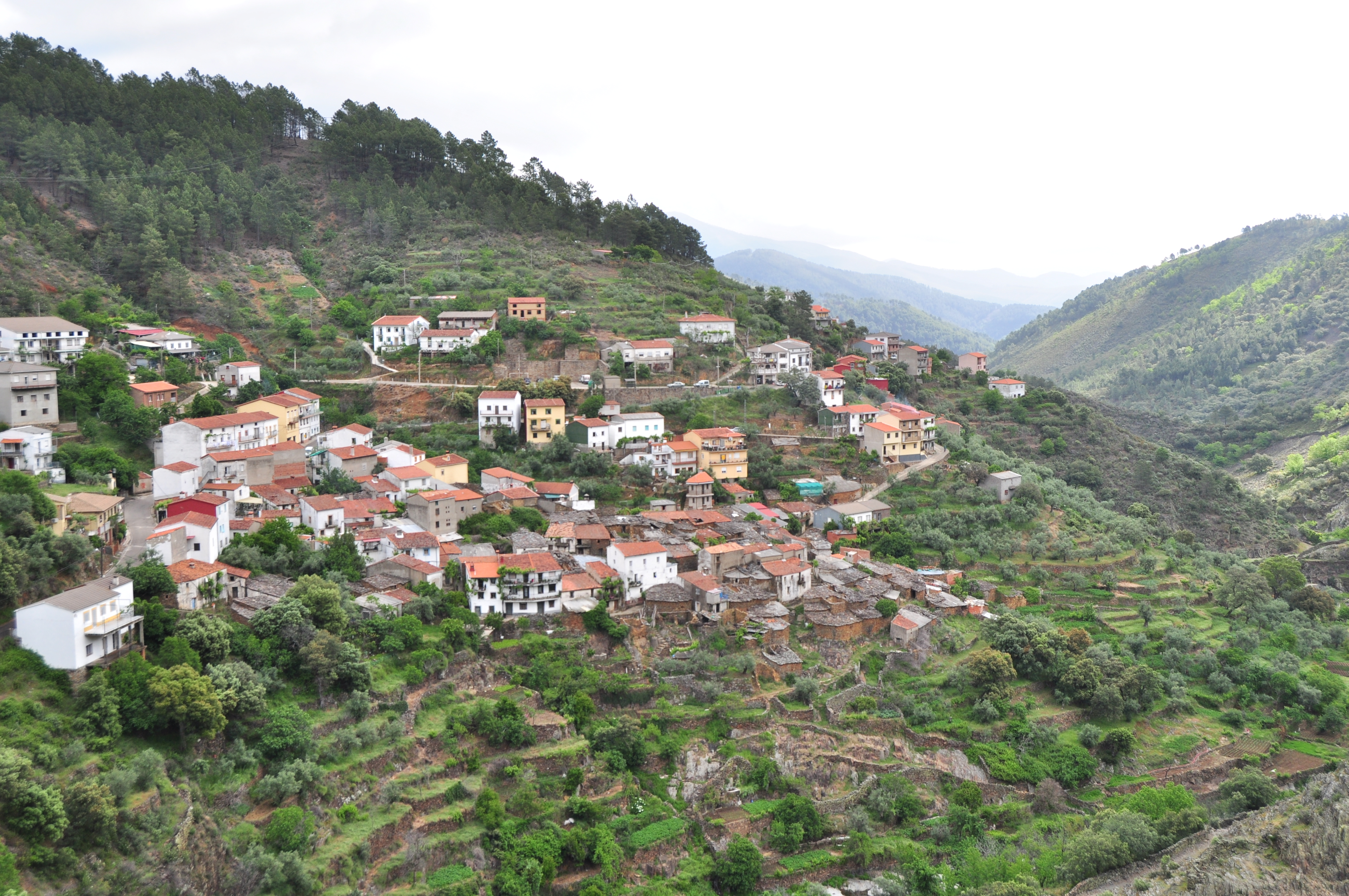

- Location within Extremadura Location within Spain
- Coordinates: 40°23′57″N 6°17′43″W
- Country: Spain
- Autonomous community: Extremadura
- Province: Province of Cáceres
- Municipality: Nuñomoral
- Elevation: 647 m (2,123 ft)

Population
  - Total: 118

Martilandrán is a village and alqueria located in the municipality of Nuñomoral, in Cáceres province, Extremadura, Spain. As of 2020, it has a population of 118.

== Geography ==
Martilandrán is located 183km north of Cáceres, Spain.
