= Rubiaco =

- Alqueria
- Location within Extremadura Location within Spain
- Coordinates: 40°24′14″N 6°12′28″W
- Country: Spain
- Autonomous community: Extremadura
- Province: Province of Cáceres
- Municipality: Nuñomoral
- Elevation: 444 m (1,457 ft)

Population
  - Total: 81

Rubiaco is a village and alqueria located in the municipality of Nuñomoral, in Cáceres province, Extremadura, Spain. As of 2020, it has a population of 81.

== Geography ==
Rubiaco is located 172km north of Cáceres, Spain.
