= Aceitunilla =

- Alqueria
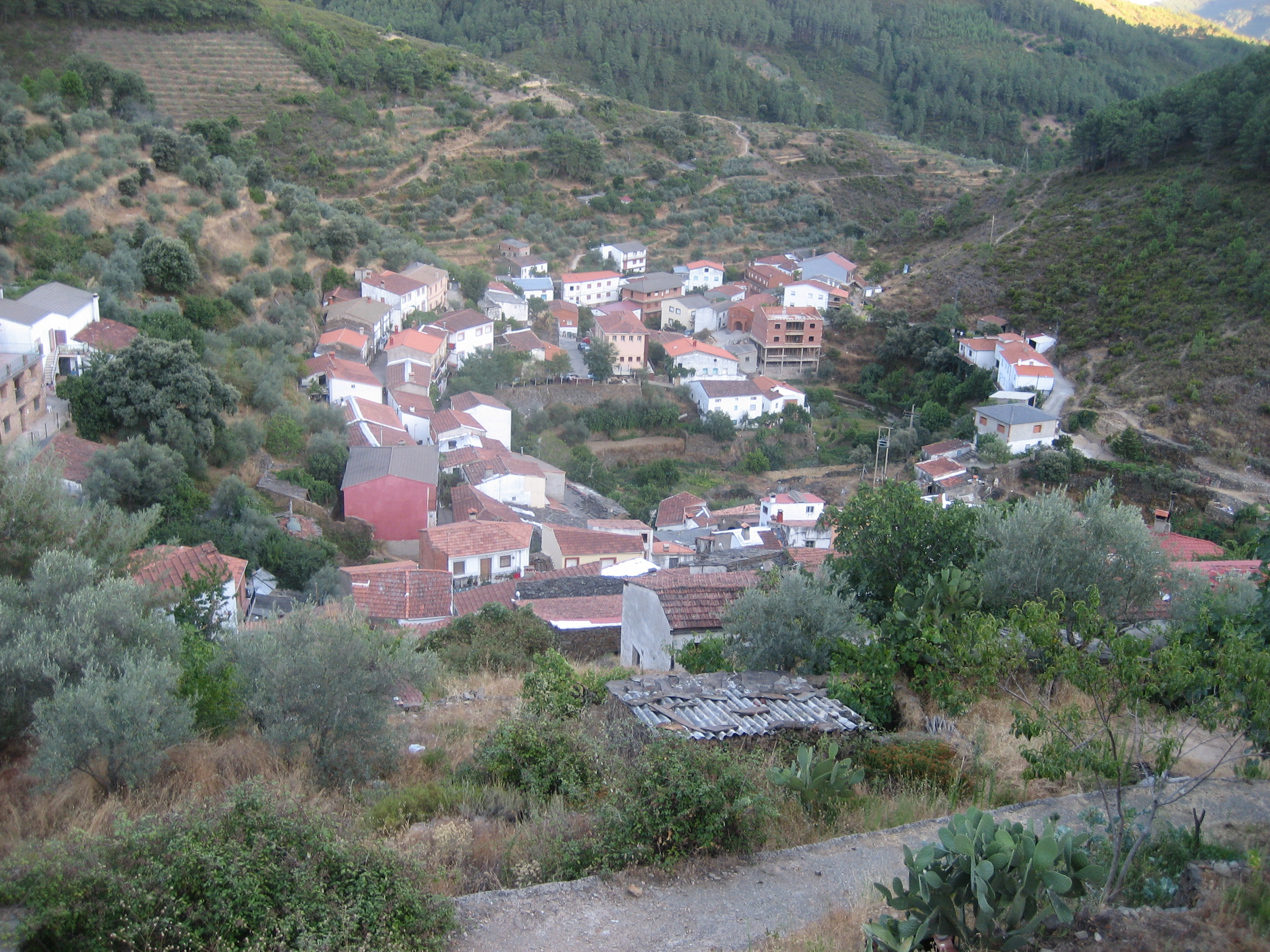

- Location within Extremadura Location within Spain
- Coordinates: 40°26′9″N 6°14′34″W
- Country: Spain
- Autonomous community: Extremadura
- Province: Province of Cáceres
- Municipality: Nuñomoral
- Elevation: 596 m (1,955 ft)

Population
  - Total: 67

Aceitunilla is a village and alqueria located in the municipality of Nuñomoral, in Cáceres province, Extremadura, Spain. As of 2020, it has a population of 67.

Aceitunilla is 179 kilometres (111 mi) north of Cáceres, Spain.
