= La Fragosa =

- Alqueria
- Fragosa
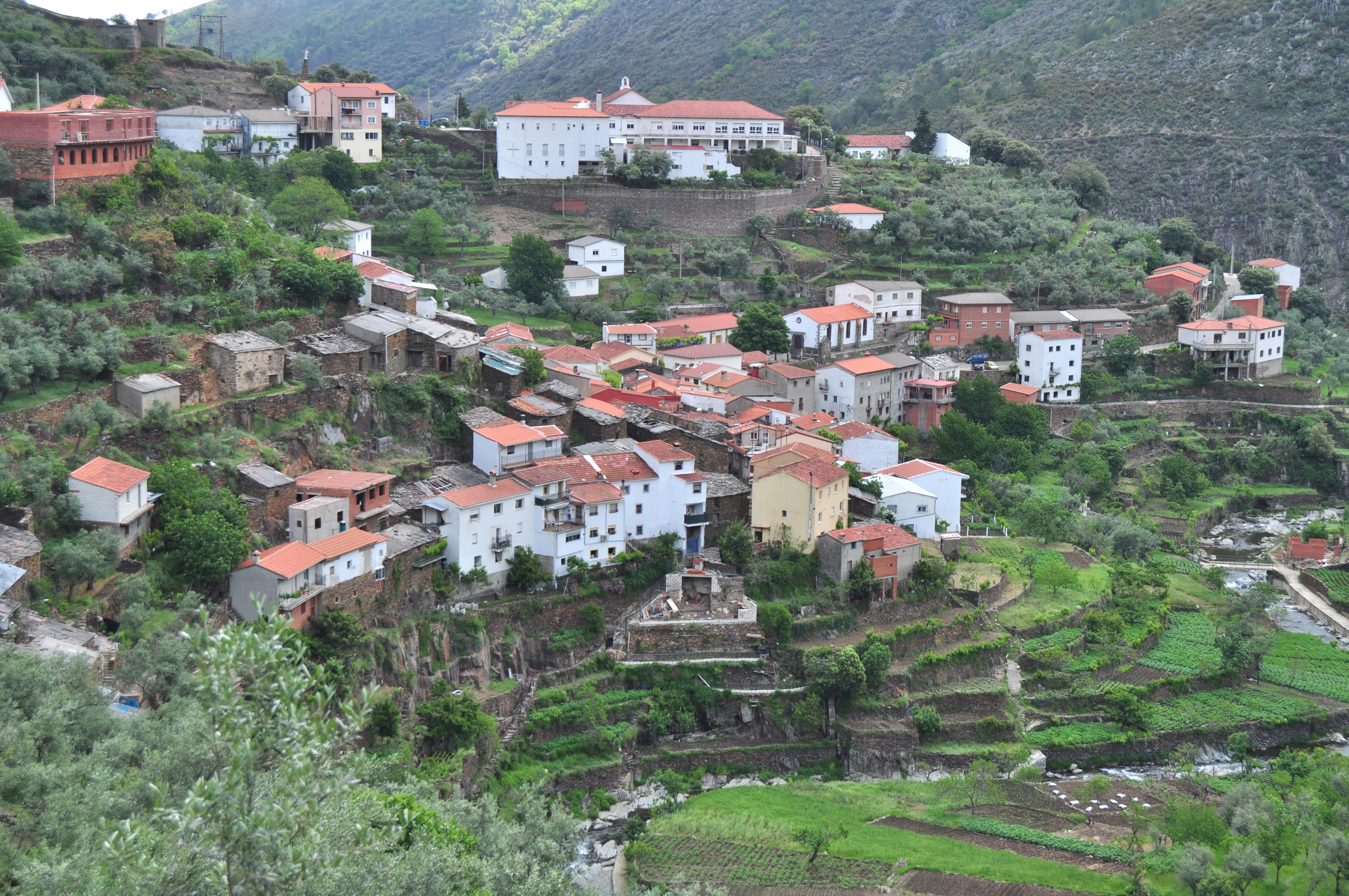

- Location within Extremadura Location within Spain
- Coordinates: 40°23′50″N 6°18′2″W
- Country: Spain
- Autonomous community: Extremadura
- Province: Province of Cáceres
- Municipality: Nuñomoral
- Elevation: 652 m (2,139 ft)

Population
  - Total: 138

La Fragosa or Fragosa is a village and alqueria located in the municipality of Nuñomoral, in Cáceres province, Extremadura, Spain. As of 2020, it has a population of 138.

== Geography ==
La Fragosa is located 184km north of Cáceres, Spain.
