= Nuñomoral =

- Municipality
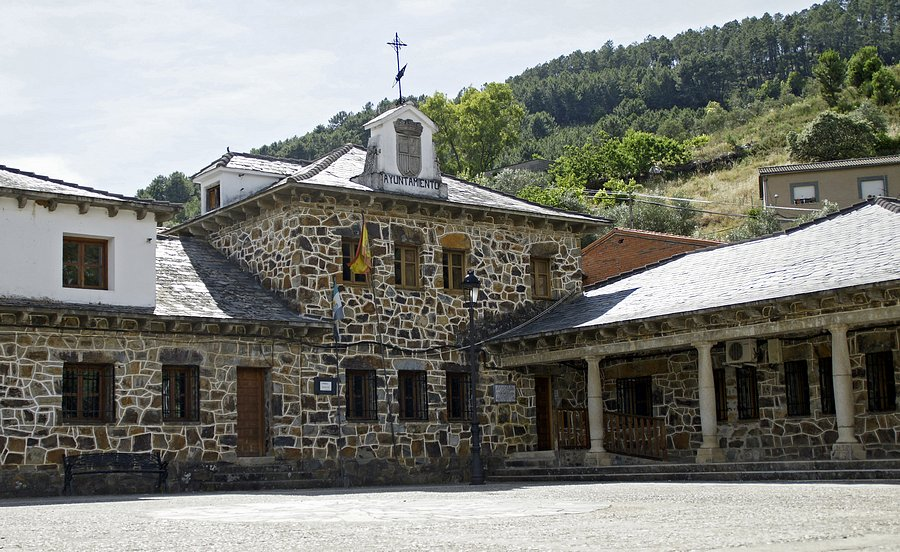
- Town hall

- Coat of arms

- Location of Nuñomoral in Extremadura Location of Nuñomoral in Spain.
- Coordinates: 40°23′N 6°10′W
- Country: Spain
- Autonomous community: Extremadura
- Province: Cáceres
- Comarca: Las Hurdes

Area
  - Total: 95 km^{2} (37 sq mi)

Population (2025-01-01)
  - Total: 1,196
  - Density: 13/km^{2} (33/sq mi)
- Time zone: UTC+1 (CET)
  - Summer (DST): UTC+2 (CEST)

Nuñomoral is the head village of a municipality of the same name located in the center of the comarca of Las Hurdes, province of Cáceres, Extremadura, Spain. According to the 2006 census (INE), the municipality has a population of 1,494 inhabitants. The Hurdano River flows through the area.

== Alquerías ==
The following alquerías (hamlets) are within the municipal limits of Nuñomoral (traditional variants of the name are in brackets):

- Aceitunilla
- Asegur (L’Asegul)
- Batuequilla (La Batuequilla)
- Cerezal (El Cerezal)
- La Fragosa
- El Gasco (El Gascu)
- Horcajada (La Horcajá)
- Martilandrán
- Rubiaco (El Rubiacu)
- Vegas de Coria (Vegas)

== History ==
The church of Nuestra Sra. de la Asunción, built in masonry, is one of the few historical buildings in the area. In Asegur there are still some local houses with the traditional shale roof.

In former times the village of Ladrillar located to the north was part of the Nuñomoral area.

== See also ==
- Las Hurdes
- List of municipalities in Cáceres
