= Asegur =

- Alqueria
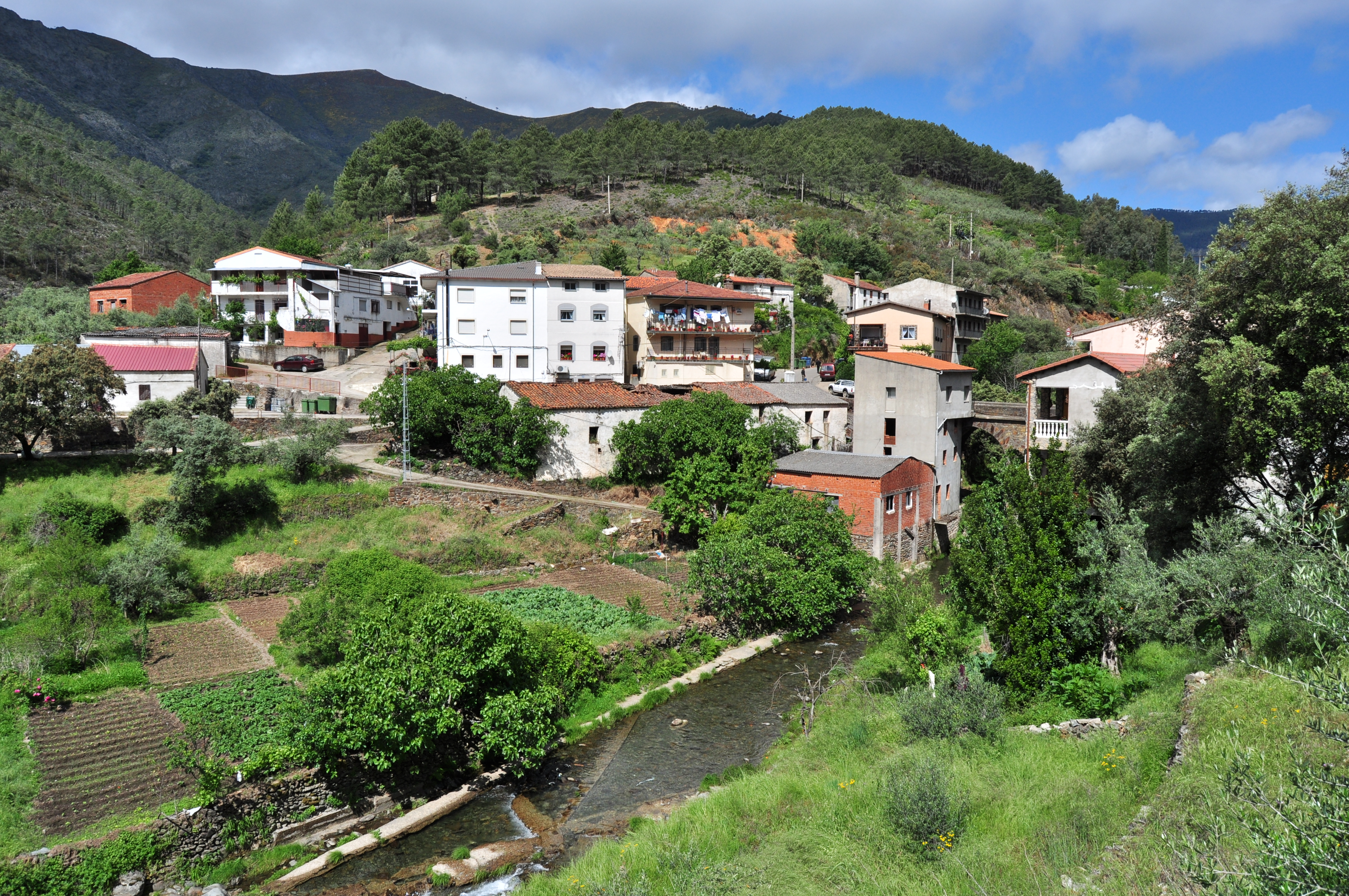

- Location within Extremadura Location within Spain
- Coordinates: 40°25′38″N 6°16′24″W
- Country: Spain
- Autonomous community: Extremadura
- Province: Province of Cáceres
- Municipality: Nuñomoral
- Elevation: 610 m (2,000 ft)

Population
  - Total: 96

Asegur is a village and alqueria located in the municipality of Nuñomoral, in Cáceres province, Extremadura, Spain. As of 2020, it has a population of 96.

== Geography ==
Asegur is located 181km north of Cáceres, Spain.
