= Jimmy Jeffs =

British air traffic controller

Jimmy Jeffs CVO OBE
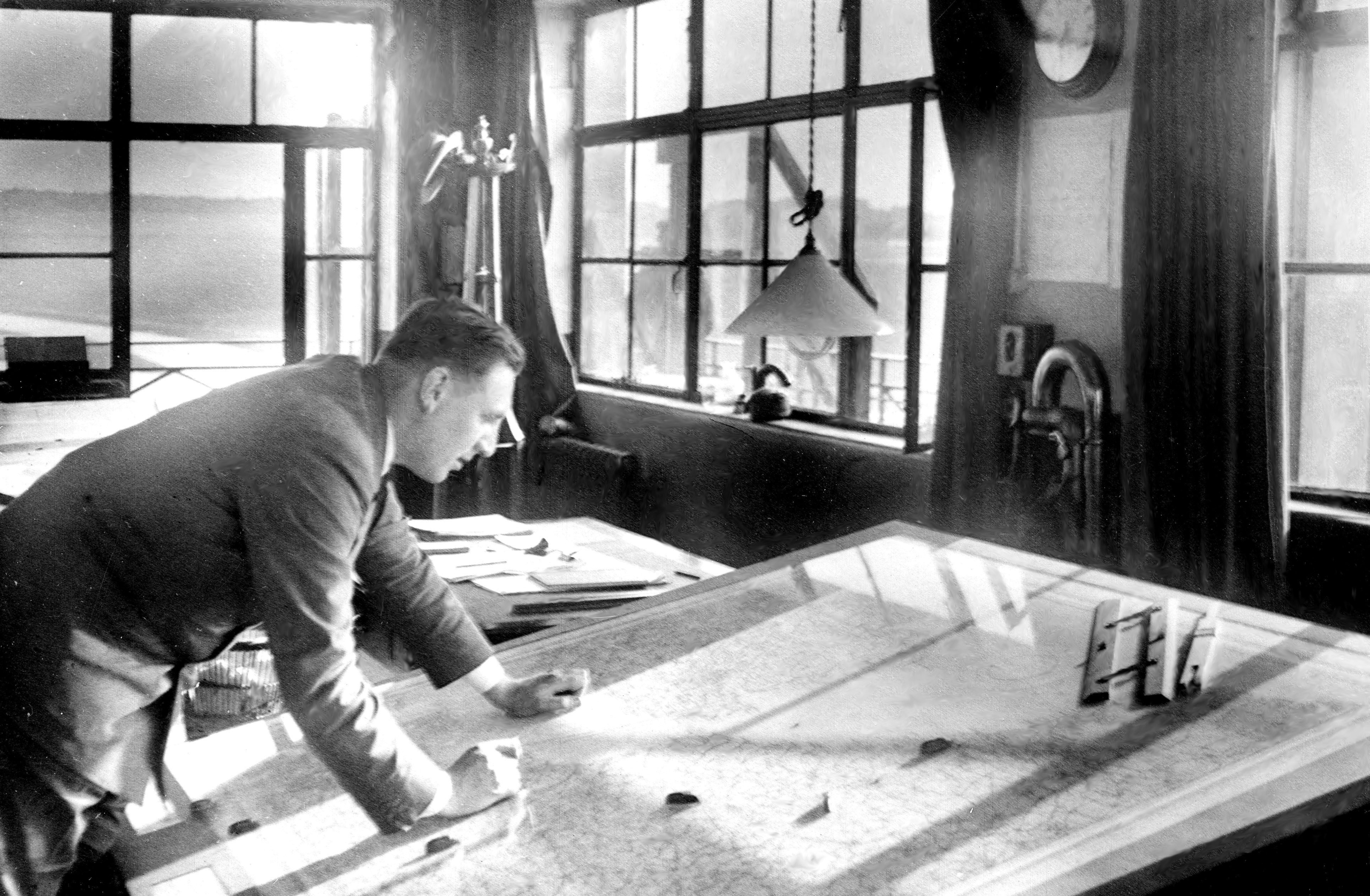
- Jimmy Jeffs at Croydon Aerodrome (1920s)
- Born: George James Horatio Jeffs; 27 January 1900; Chilvers Coton, UK
- Died: 14 May 1996 (aged 96); Bournemouth, UK
- Military career
- Allegiance: GB
- Awards: Legion of Merit (1946)

George James Horatio Jeffs, commonly known as Jimmy Jeffs CVO OBE (27 January 1900 - 14 May 1996) was a civilian air traffic control officer at Croydon Airport, London. He was issued Air Traffic Control License No. 1. dated 22 February 1922, and is credited with developing several early procedures for preventing aircraft collisions.

== Early life ==
George Jeffs was born on 27 January 1900 in Chilvers Coton, Warwickshire. He was educated at Kedleston Grammar School and served in the Royal Naval Air Service and Royal Air Force during the First World War, and subsequently at the Air Ministry.

== Early air traffic control ==
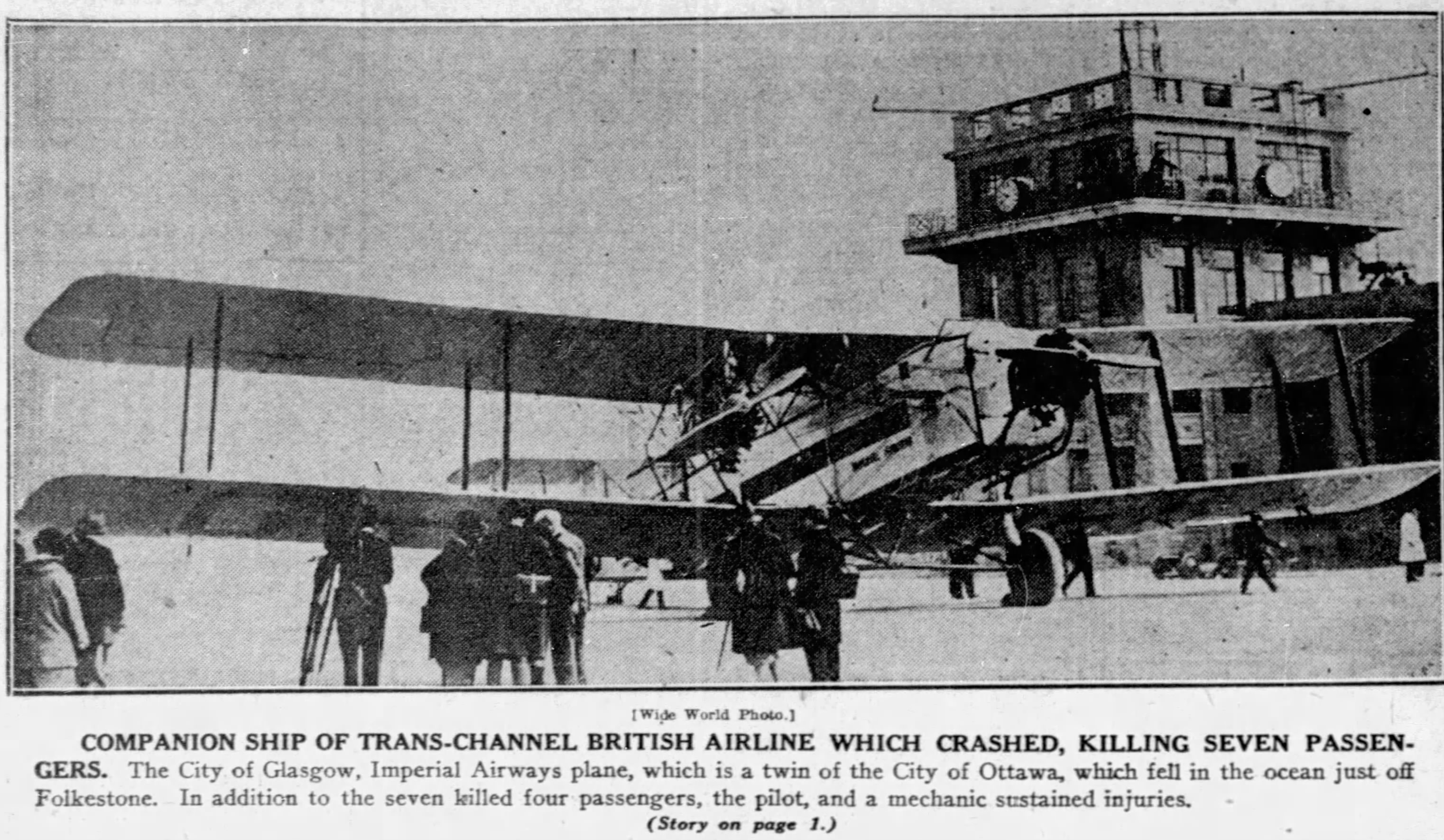
1929 photograph of Imperial Airways airplane, the City of Glasgow, an Armstrong Whitworth Argosy Mk. I airplane, with the air traffic control tower in the background.

In 1922 Jeffs was recruited as Civil Aviation Traffic Officer (C.A.T.O.) to Croydon Airport. It was then that Air Traffic Control (ATC) first developed. (Note: ATC clearance procedures were introduced at Croydon following the 1920 aircraft crash near Croydon, and further developed following the 1922 Picardie mid-air collision.) One of the first air traffic officers at Croydon Airport, others included Bill Lawford, Commander Deacon, Captain John Percival Morkham and Mr Russell. (Note: The first air traffic control officers were generally already airport employed personnel with some flying experience rather than specifically trained for the role.) H. W. Chattaway from Instone joined later. Jeffs was retrospectively issued Air Traffic Control License No. 1. dated 22 February 1922. Initially he used aircraft radio reports and his own calculations to locate the planes and represented them with different coloured pins pierced onto a large cross-channel routes map that he stuck to the back of an old cork bathmat. As the aircraft moved along their routes he adjusted the pins accordingly. Later, he added flags to mark call signs and altitudes. He developed several early procedures for preventing aircraft collisions.

In 1934 Jeffs was transferred to Heston. In 1938 he was appointed Inspector of Air Traffic Control in the Department of the Director-General of Civil Aviation at the Air Ministry.

== Second World War ==
Jeffs was commissioned to RAF Fighter Command at the onset of the Second World War. He was then posted to Overseas Control and then Transatlantic Air Control, Prestwick. He led the organisation of the North Atlantic Airspace. Before being transferred to the Ministry of Aviation in 1945, he spent time at HQ RAF Ferry Command, Montreal, and at RAF Transport Command.

== Later air traffic control ==
In 1950 Jeffs was made Commander at Prestwick Airport. In 1956 he succeeded Sir John D'Albiac as Commander of London Airport. In 1957 he was appointed to Heathrow. During his career other postings included Glasgow, Manchester, Belfast, Liverpool, Blackpool, Docaster, Aberdeen, Edinburgh, Jersey, Isle of Man, Hull, Orkney, Southampton, Lympne, and Gatwick.

== Retirement ==
In 1960 Jeffs retired from Croydon, and was succeeded by Chattaway. Following retirement and having also been founding vice-president of the Historic Croydon Airport Society, he remained active in consulting on aviation matters.

== Awards and honours ==
In 1946 the United States awarded Jeffs with the Legion of Merit. In 1960 he was made CVO.

== Death ==
Jeffs died at home on 14 May 1996 in Bournemouth. He was survived by his wife, Phyllis, and their children.
