= Gasco (surname) =

Gasco is a Puerto Rican surname. Notable people with the surname include:

- Dario Alejandro Gasco (born 1987), Argentine professional mountain biker
- Elyse Gasco (born 1967), Canadian fiction writer
- Ernesto Gasco (born 1963), Spanish politician
- Vincent Gasco (1907–1961), Spanish footballer
- Walter López Gasco (born 1985), Uruguayan footballer

== See also ==
- Gasco (disambiguation)
- Agustín García-Gasco Vicente (1931–2011), Spanish Cardinal of the Catholic Church
- Tina Gascó (1914–1973), Spanish actress
- Garcia Moniz, o Gasco, medieval Knight
