= Guild of Air Traffic Control Officers =

- Abbreviation: GATCO
- Founded: 1954
- Type: Professional association
- Headquarters: United Kingdom
- Members: 2,000+ (2004)
- Parent organization: International Federation of Air Traffic Controllers' Associations (member association)

The Guild of Air Traffic Control Officers (GATCO) is a guild of air traffic controllers which began organising in 1952 and was established in 1954. In 2004, it had over 2000 members spread over 125 locations in the UK and overseas in both civilian and military sectors.

== Activities ==
GATCO represents the professional interests and opinions of those in the air traffic management profession by addressing medical, training, licensing and legal matters in the aviation sector and monitoring medical aspects of licensing, stress, and working hours of ATCOs. GATCO deals with the professional and technical interests of those working in the air traffic management profession – it is not a union and does not deal with employment issues such as terms and conditions.

To facilitate dialogue between pilots and controllers, GATCO in cooperation with the British Airline Pilots' Association (BALPA) host annual Controller-Pilot Symposia in the form of online webinars.

GATCO is run by an Executive Board supported by other officers and a team of representatives who sit on various key aviation committees. GATCO also has regional and unit representatives throughout the UK and abroad.

=== Membership ===
Membership is open to civil or military air traffic controllers, flight information service officers, aerospace battle managers (weapons) and anyone involved in air traffic management support including non-operational positions. GATCO members are employed at units from small general aviation and military airfields to major international airports and en route centres. Members also include UK licensed controllers working abroad.

GATCO membership is also open to corporate members which throughout the years included airlines such as British Airways and bmi, equipment manufacturers and communication systems developers such as Thales, Frequentis and Micronav, defence technology companies such as Qinetiq, and training providers such as Global ATS, FTE Jerez and ITAerea.

=== International ===
GATCO is the UK member association of the International Federation of Air Traffic Controllers’ Associations (IFATCA). IFATCA is a worldwide organisation representing more than 50,000 air traffic controllers in 130 countries. IFATCA was formed in 1961 and GATCO joined a year later. The main goals of the federation are to promote safety, efficiency and regularity in international air navigation and to assist and advise in the development of safe and orderly systems of air traffic control and new procedures and facilities. International cooperation is fundamental in the current ATM world. GATCO is ideally placed for the development and interchange of technical and professional information not only within Europe but on a worldwide stage.

Over the years, GATCO has played a leading role within the federation, providing numerous reports and working papers. Many of these papers have formed the basis of IFATCA policy which, in turn, have been fed into International Civil Aviation Organization (ICAO) working groups which develop civil aviation regulations worldwide. This involvement allows the views and concerns of individual GATCO members to be heard and provides the opportunity to influence worldwide aviation regulations and procedures. Additionally, many GATCO members have held and currently hold positions within IFATCA, from members of standing committees and international representatives to members of IFATCA's own Executive Board. Being involved with IFATCA provides a unique opportunity for air traffic controllers to take active part in the discussion and decision-making of air traffic management matters at international and European levels, benefiting both the organisation and the individual's career.

=== Representatives in Working Groups and Committees ===
For many years GATCO has provided representatives to serve on other aviation organisation's committees. It is through these channels that GATCO exerts influence and provides help and advice to the wider aviation community. As of July 2020, the list of organisation committees with GATCO representation included:

1. Airspace Infringement Working Group (AIWG), CAA: All the issues relating to airspace infringement in UK airspace are addressed through this Civil Aviation Authority Working Group.
2. Air Pilots Technical Committee, The Honourable Company of Air Pilots: The Air Pilots Technical Committee is the focal point for all aviation technical matters within The Honourable Company of Air Pilots. This Guild sponsors and encourages action and activities designed to ensure that aircraft are piloted and navigated safely by both pilots and navigators.
3. Air Traffic Services Group (ATS), BALPA: The British Airline Pilots' Association's (BALPA’s) ATS group provides detailed comment on Air Traffic Management (ATM), ATC and issues emanating from the UK, European and international regulators, Government and ICAO.
4. All-Party Parliamentary Group on General Aviation (APPG-GA): The APPG-GA promotes the objective, as set out by the British Government, of making the UK the best country in the world for GA. It aims to protect and enhance the UK network of GA airfields, creating high-tech jobs and growth.
5. Association of UK Flight Information Service Officers (AUKFISO): The AUKFISO unites all the Flight Information Service (FIS) units throughout the UK. They deal with the various aspects of the FIS service and work with the CAA on enhancing and developing the service members units provide.
6. Confidential Human Factors Incident Reporting Programme (CHIRP): The main aim of CHIRP is to contribute to the enhancement of aviation safety in the UK by providing a totally independent and confidential reporting system for all individuals employed in or associated with the aviation industry.
7. Flight Operations Group (FOG), RAeS: The FOG of the Royal Aeronautical Society (RAeS) represents the views and interests of those involved in all aspects of flight operations with a particular focus on commercial transport. The group includes commercial, private and glider pilots, flight engineers, air traffic controllers, cabin crew and managers.
8. Future Airspace Strategy Industry Information Group (FASIIG): FASIIG, a subgroup of the Future Airspace Strategy (FAS) coordinates the activities required across the aviation sector to develop an efficient UK airspace that has the capacity to meet change in demand for UK airspace, while at the same time balancing the needs of all stakeholders, maintaining the levels of safety and reducing the environmental impact of the aviation sector.
9. General Aviation Safety Council (GASCo): GASCo is a charity that works to improve flight safety in all forms of general aviation. It is funded by the contributions of member organisations, pilots, aviation authorities and the public.
10. National Air Traffic Management Advisory Committee (NATMAC), CAA: The CAA's Director of Airspace Policy (DAP) carries out consultations on aviation legislation changes. To get a wide variety of views the NATMAC provides a panel of representatives from all aspects of aviation who advise DAP on all airspace requirements.
11. Remotely Piloted Aircraft Systems Group (RPAS), BALPA: The British Airline Pilots Association's (BALPA’s) RPAS group continually reviews technology, supports research, assesses potential risks, and works with regulators on new legislation in the RPAS domain to make commercial aviation as safe as possible.
12. UK Airprox Board: The UK Airprox Board's primary objective is to enhance air safety in the UK, in particular in respect of lessons to be learned and applied from airprox occurrences reported within UK airspace. UKAB is sponsored jointly, and funded equally, by the CAA and the Military Aviation Authority (MAA). Members are nominated by civil/military organisations, sitting as experts and not representing any group or organisation.
13. UK Flight Safety Committee (UKFSC): The UKFSC is a fully representative group of aviation safety professionals committed to further the cause of flight safety. Their meetings are attended by airlines, regulators, experts from most disciplines within the industry and unions to discuss accidents, incidents and safety issues within the aviation industry.
14. Unmanned Aircraft System (UAS) Specialist Group, RAeS: The UAS Specialist Group of the Royal Aeronautical Society (RAeS) aims to act as focus for all RAeS’ activities on UAS and promotes the safe and effective development, production and operation of UAS for defence, security and commercial purposes.

== Executive Board ==
As of 17 October 2021, GATCO Executive Board consisted of:

Position	Name
President	Mark Taylor
Chief Executive Officer	Mark Taylor
Deputy President	Katie Mason
Vice President (Policy)	Adam Exley
Vice President (Communications)	Olivia May
Vice President (Administration & Finance)	Ian Fyfe-Green
Executive Secretary	Andrew Belshaw
