= El Gasco =

- Alqueria
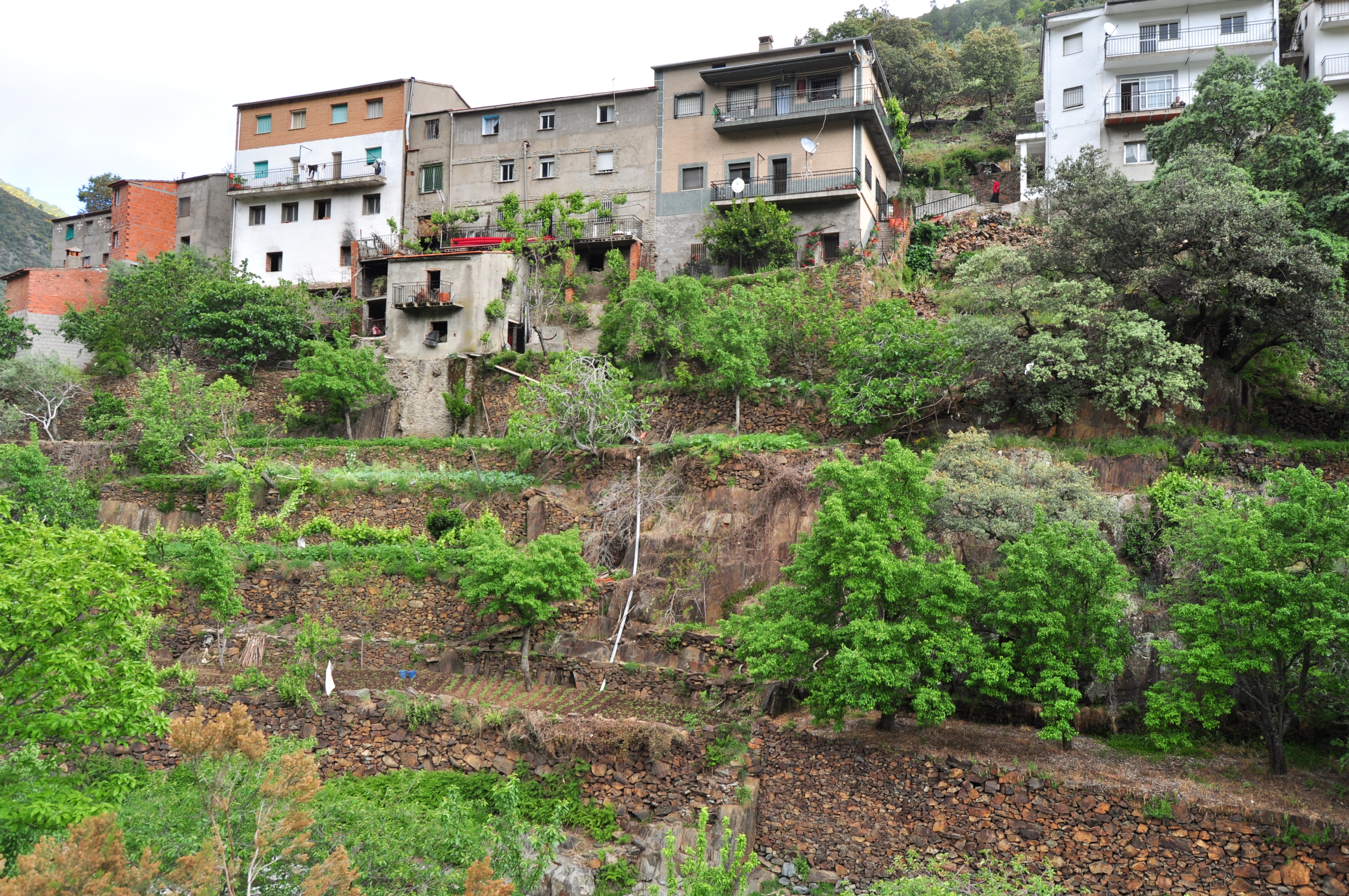

- Location within Extremadura Location within Spain
- Coordinates: 40°23′54″N 6°19′1″W
- Country: Spain
- Autonomous community: Extremadura
- Province: Province of Cáceres
- Municipality: Nuñomoral
- Elevation: 841 m (2,759 ft)

Population
  - Total: 104

El Gasco is a village and alqueria located in the municipality of Nuñomoral, in Cáceres province, Extremadura, Spain. As of 2020, it has a population of 104.

== Geography ==
El Gasco is located 185km north of Cáceres, Spain.
