= Vegas de Coria =

- Alqueria
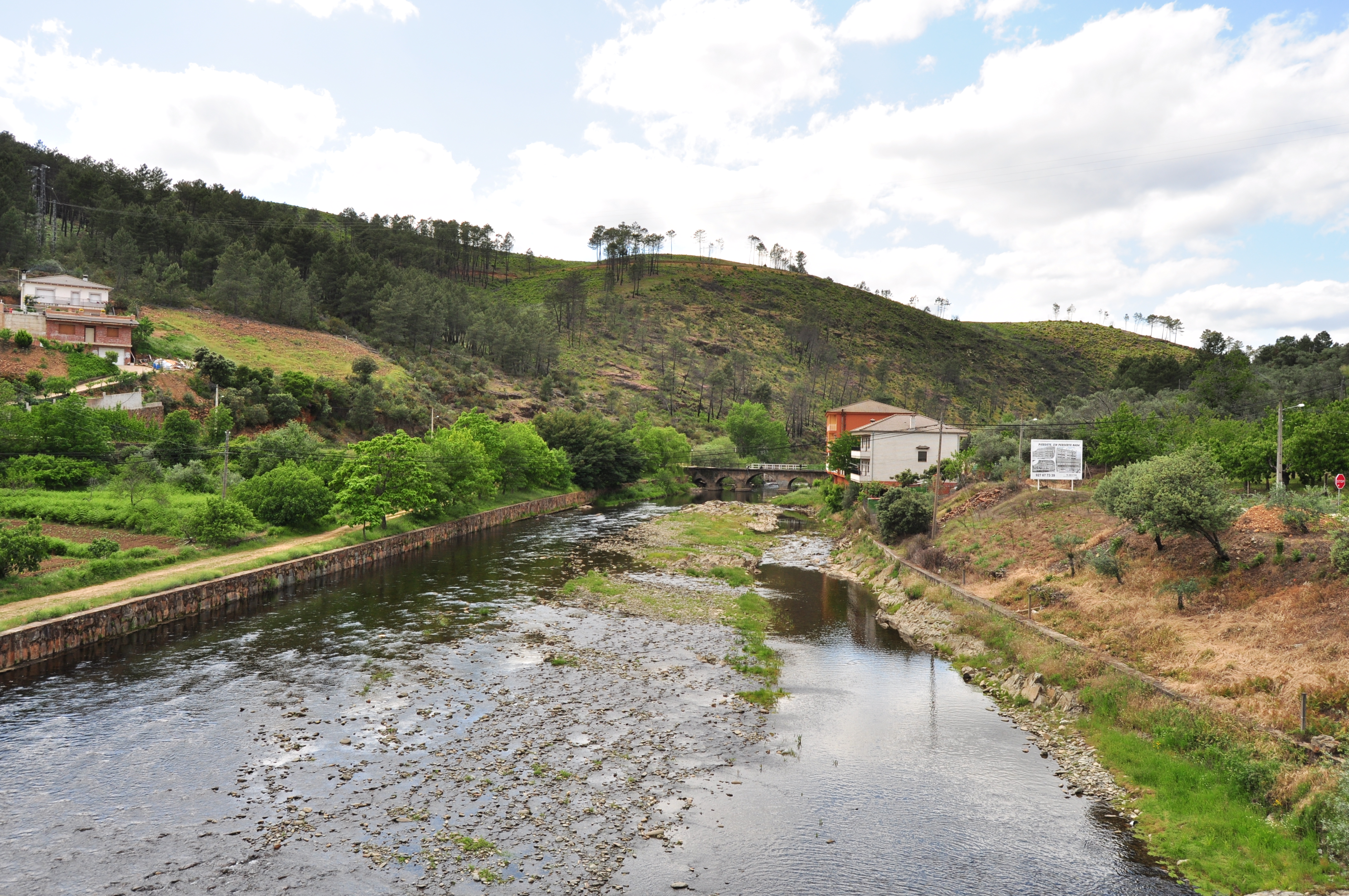

- Location within Extremadura Location within Spain
- Coordinates: 40°23′10″N 6°10′59″W
- Country: Spain
- Autonomous community: Extremadura
- Province: Province of Cáceres
- Municipality: Nuñomoral
- Elevation: 438 m (1,437 ft)

Population
  - Total: 220

Vegas de Coria is a village and alqueria located in the municipality of Nuñomoral, in Cáceres province, Extremadura, Spain. As of 2020, it has a population of 220.

== Geography ==
Vegas de Coria is located 168 km north-northeast of Cáceres, Spain.
