= La Siberia =

Coordinates: 39°09′00″N 05°06′00″W

- Comarca
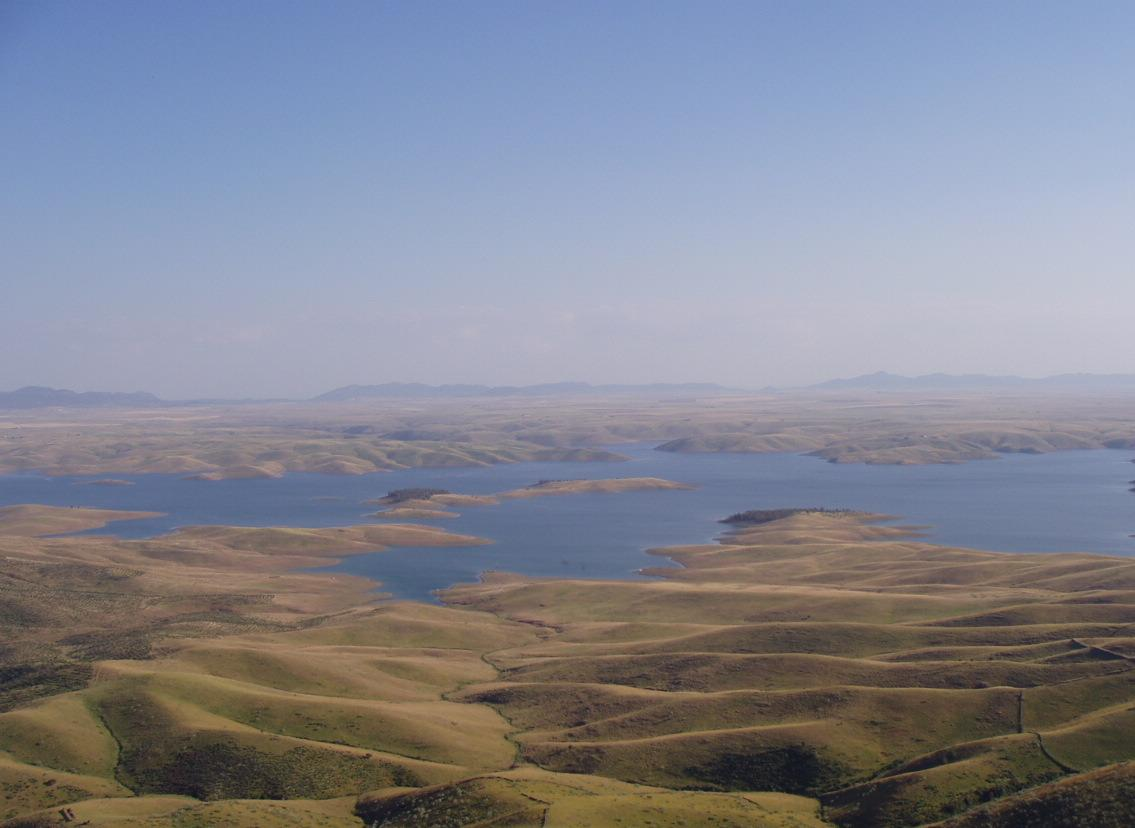
- Reservoir of La Serena, the largest in Spain.
- Interactive map of La Siberia
- Country: Spain
- Autonomous community: Extremadura
- Province: Badajoz
- Capital: Herrera del Duque
- Municipalities: List: Baterno, Casas de Don Pedro, Castilblanco, Esparragosa de Lares, Fuenlabrada de los Montes, Garbayuela, Garlitos, Helechosa de los Montes, Herrera del Duque, Puebla de Alcocer, El Risco, Sancti-Spiritus, Siruela, Talarrubias, Tamurejo, Valdecaballeros, Villarta de los Montes

Area
  - Total: 2,836.7 km^{2} (1,095.3 sq mi)

Population (2015)
  - Total: 21,422
  - Density: 7.5517/km^{2} (19.559/sq mi)
- Time zone: UTC+1 (CET)
  - Summer (DST): UTC+2 (CEST)
- Largest municipality: Herrera del Duque

La Siberia is a comarca in the northeastern portion of the province of Badajoz in the autonomous community of Extremadura, Spain. Its capital is the municipality of Herrera del Duque. The comarca is bordered to the north by the provinces of Cáceres and Toledo, on the west by Las Vegas Altas comarca, on the south by La Serena comarca, and on the east by the province of Ciudad Real. The district contains 18 municipalities with a combined area of 2,943 km^{2} (1,136 sq mi) and a population of 29,214 people.

== Municipalities ==
La Siberia contains 18 municipalities:

- Herrera del Duque (capital)
- Baterno
- Casas de Don Pedro
- Castilblanco
- Esparragosa de Lares
- Fuenlabrada de los Montes
- Garbayuela
- Garlitos
- Helechosa de los Montes
- Navalvillar de Pela
- Puebla de Alcocer
- El Risco
- Sancti-Spiritus
- Siruela
- Talarrubias
- Tamurejo
- Valdecaballeros
- Villarta de los Montes

== History ==
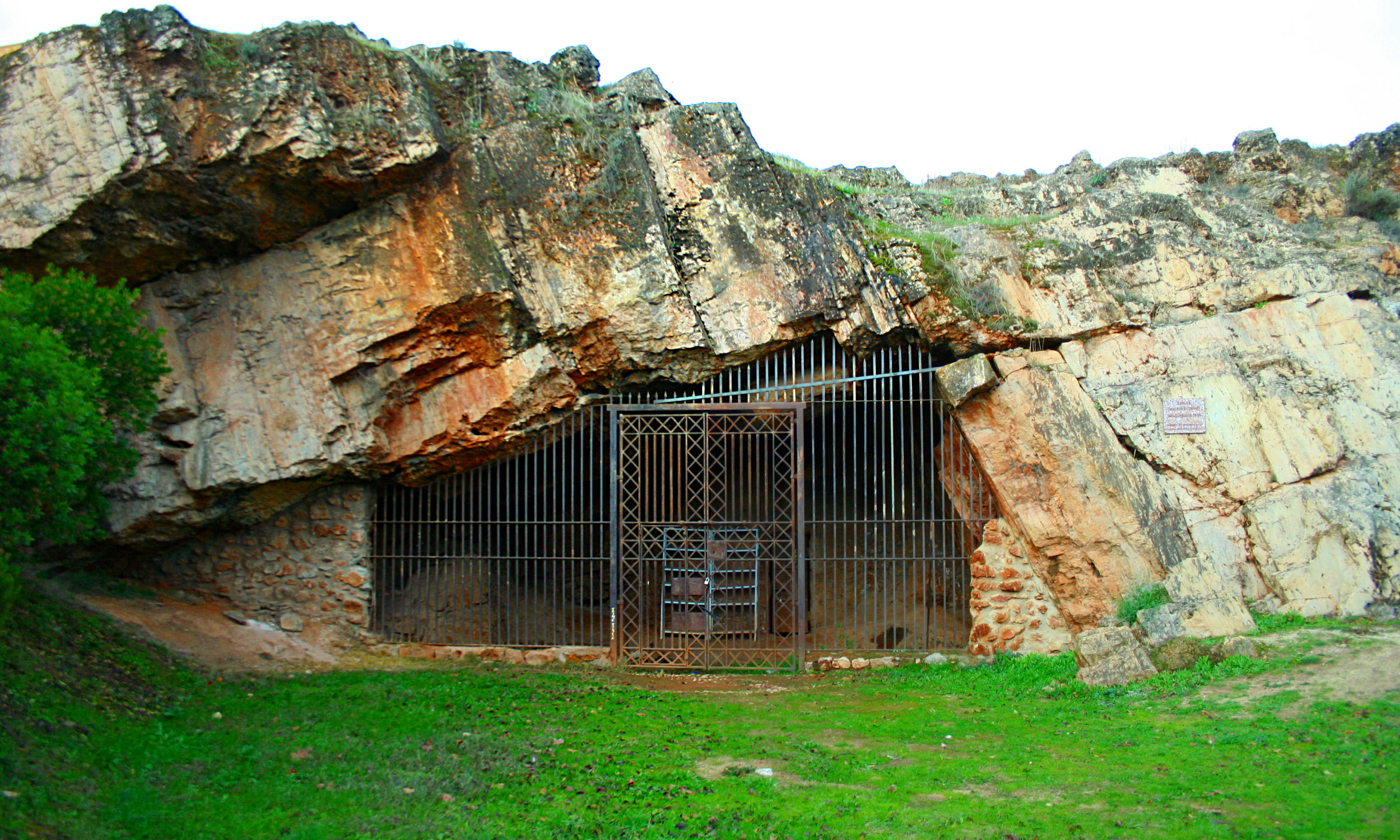
The entrance to Maltravieso Cave

La Siberia dates back to prehistory, when inhabitants were hunters and gatherers, semi-nomadic in nature. Rupestrian (made of rock) cave paintings and stone tools have been found from this era. The most prolific paintings in the area (though not in La Siberia itself) are those in the Maltravieso Cave from the Aurignacian era. Human remains and ceramics have also been found in the cave.

== Geography ==
La Siberia is a land of varying terrain. The foothills of the Montes de Toledo dominate the north, and the flatter Sierra Morena runs through the south. Two major rivers flow through the region, creating vast peneplains in the less mountainous areas. Poor soil as a result of erosion in the peneplains makes the region poorly suited for agriculture, so most of the population relies on livestock as their principal economic activity. The Guadiana River flows the entire length of the comarca from northeast to southwest, going on to form most of the southern portion of the border between Spain and Portugal. The region's inhabitants have created several reservoirs along the Guadiana, providing locals with ample water resources. The largest of the reservoirs are the Cijara, the García de Sola, and the Orellana. Also, in the southern portion of La Siberia flows the Zujar River, which contains two large reservoirs - the Zujar and the La Serena, the latter being the largest in Spain and the second largest in Europe. The combined maximum capacity of these five reservoirs is approximately 6.395 billion m^{3} (2.258×10^{11} cu ft), or about 12% of Spain's water resources; La Serena alone holds 6% of the country's water. The region is well known for its abundant water resources; because of all the reservoirs, La Siberia contains the longest inland coastline of any region of Spain and also the largest amount of freshwater in the whole of the Iberian Peninsula.

=== Flora and fauna ===
With a population density of just under 10 inhabitants per square kilometre (26/sq mi), much lower than Spain's average of 70/km^{2} (180/sq mi), the area's landscape is dominated by a very diverse collection of trees, the most dominant being the oak. Other types of trees include quercus faginea, chestnut, ash, willow, eucalyptus, and pine.

Almost all of the region has been declared a Special Protection Area (SPA) for birds because of the large populations of endangered species such as Eurasian black vultures and owls. Large populations of partridges, pigeons, doves, and many other species of birds also inhabit the area.

Hunting small game is a common pastime in La Siberia; the most-prized animal being the red-legged partridge. Other small game includes phasianidae, quail, columbidae, rabbits, hares, and foxes. Larger game is also hunted in the region, the most frequent being deer, wild boar, mouflon, and ibexen.

Fishing is also popular in the comarca. Fish native to the area include common barbel, Iberian nase, tench, and brown trout. Species that have been introduced by locals include carp, black bass, and pumpkinseed.

=== Climate ===
La Siberia lies between two climate zones - a continental climate to the north and a Mediterranean climate to the south - making this area a transition zone. Most of the area lies in the Mediterranean zone, but the far north has a continental climate. Summers are long and hot while winters are short and moderately cold.

La Siberia has an average high of 23.3 °C (73.9 °F) and an average low of 9.9 °C (49.8 °F). The hottest month is July with an average high/low of 34.3 °C (93.7 °F)/17.0 °C (62.6 °F), and the coldest month is January with an average high/low of 13.9 °C (57.0 °F)/3.2 °C (37.8 °F).

The region only receives 463 mm (18.2 in) per year, lower than Spain's average, 639.5 mm (25.18 in). The wettest month of the year is December, receiving 73 mm (2.9 in) of precipitation, and the driest month is July, receiving only 4 mm (0.16 in).
