= Risco, Badajoz =

Risco
- Municipality
- Location in Spain
- Coordinates: 38°54′N 5°7′W
- Country: Spain
- Autonomous community: Extremadura
- Province: Badajoz
- Comarca: La Siberia

Government
  - Alcalde: Luis Sánchez Corchero

Area
  - Total: 39.5 km^{2} (15.3 sq mi)
- Elevation: 497 m (1,631 ft)

Population (2025-01-01)
  - Total: 126
- Time zone: UTC+1 (CET)
  - Summer (DST): UTC+2 (CEST)

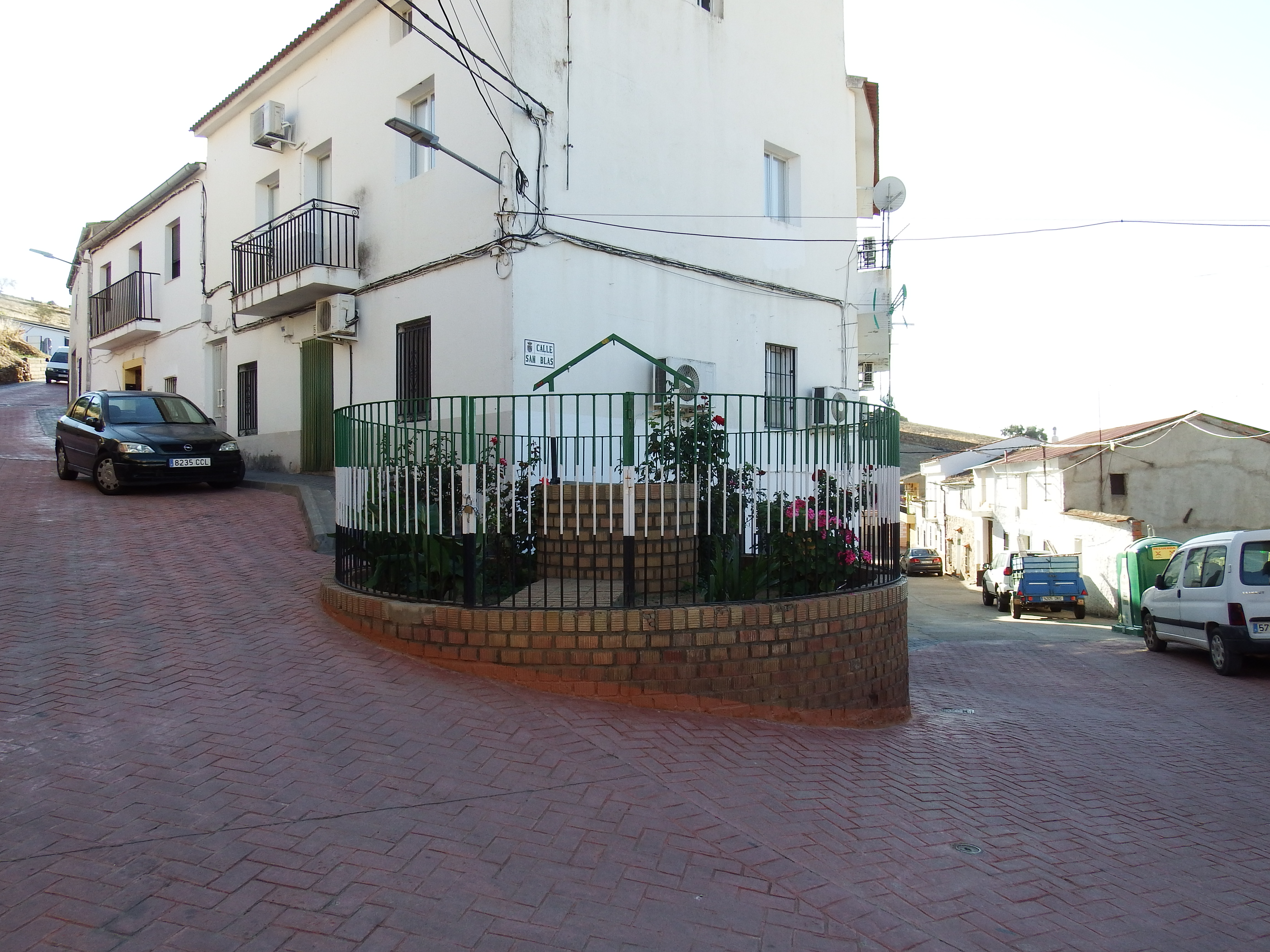
Water well at Calle San Blas

Risco is a Spanish municipality in the province of Badajoz, Extremadura. According to the 2014 census, the municipality has a population of 151 inhabitants.

== See also ==
- List of municipalities in Badajoz
