= Puebla de Alcocer =

Coordinates: 38°59′N 5°15′W

- municipality
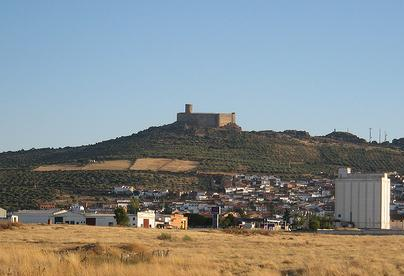

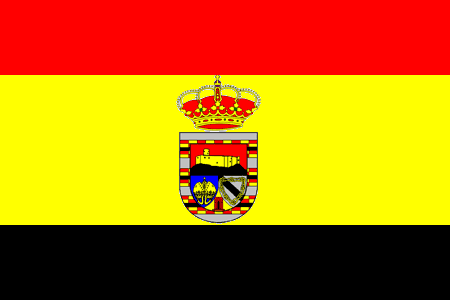
- Flag Coat of arms
- Interactive map of Puebla de Alcocer
- Country: Spain
- Autonomous community: Extremadura
- Province: Badajoz

Area
  - Total: 297 km^{2} (115 sq mi)
- Elevation: 527 m (1,729 ft)

Population (2025-01-01)
  - Total: 1,091
  - Density: 3.67/km^{2} (9.51/sq mi)
- Time zone: UTC+1 (CET)
  - Summer (DST): UTC+2 (CEST)

Puebla de Alcocer is a municipality located in the province of Badajoz, Extremadura, Spain. It is located in the comarca of La Siberia. According to the 2005 census (INE), the municipality has a population of 1269 inhabitants.

Puebla de Alcocer is the birthplace of one of the tallest persons alive in his time, Agustin Luengo (El Gigante Extremeño), who was born in 1826. Luengo was about 7'8" tall, or 235cm.

Puebla de Alcocer is located about 2 miles away from the La Serena reservoir, Spain's largest.

== See also ==
- List of municipalities in Badajoz
