= Villarta de los Montes =

Coordinates: 39°13′N 4°47′W

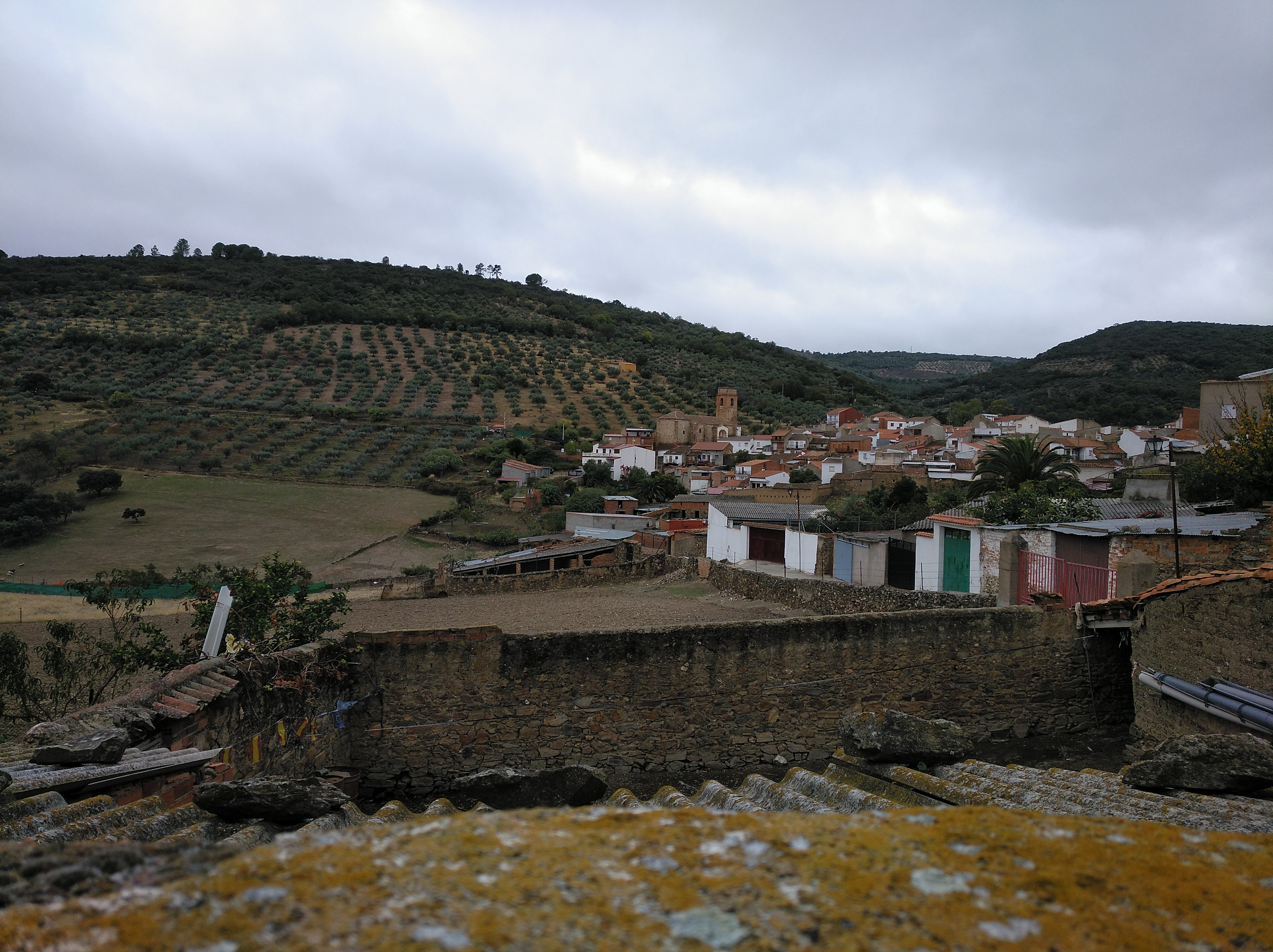

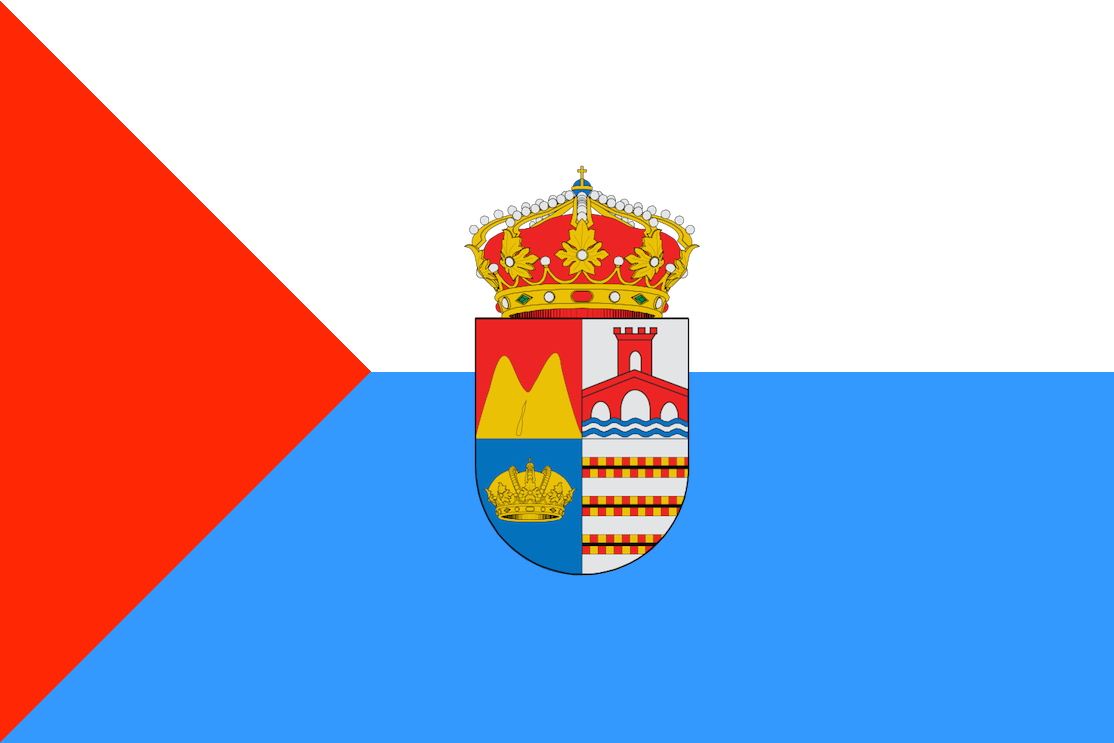
- Flag Coat of arms
- Interactive map of Villarta de los Montes
- Country: Spain
- Autonomous community: Extremadura
- Province: Badajoz
- Comarca: La Siberia

Government
  - Alcalde: David Rodríguez Castellanos

Area
  - Total: 123.3 km^{2} (47.6 sq mi)
- Elevation: 551 m (1,808 ft)

Population (2025-01-01)
  - Total: 375
- Time zone: UTC+1 (CET)
  - Summer (DST): UTC+2 (CEST)

Villarta de los Montes is a Spanish municipality in the province of Badajoz, Extremadura. It has a population of 595 (2007) and an area of 123.3 km^{2} (47.6 sq mi).

== Geography ==
Villarta de los Montes is located about 150 km east-northeast of Mérida and about 200 km east-northeast of Badajoz, at an elevation of about 550 m. The Guadiana River is dammed here to form the Cijara Reservoir. The climate is temperate in winter and warm to hot in summer. Annual precipitation is relatively low, at about 546 mm, and is distributed throughout the year except during the almost rainless summer months.

== Population ==
Year	1970	1981	1991	2001	2011	2021
Population	1,401	1,043	868	631	550	421

The significant decline in population since the 1950s is mainly attributed to the mechanization of agriculture, the abandonment of small family farms, and the resulting loss of employment opportunities, a process associated with rural flight.

== Places of interest ==
- Church of Mary Magdalene
- Chapel of Our Lady

== See also ==
- List of municipalities in Badajoz
