= Esparragosa de Lares =

- Municipality
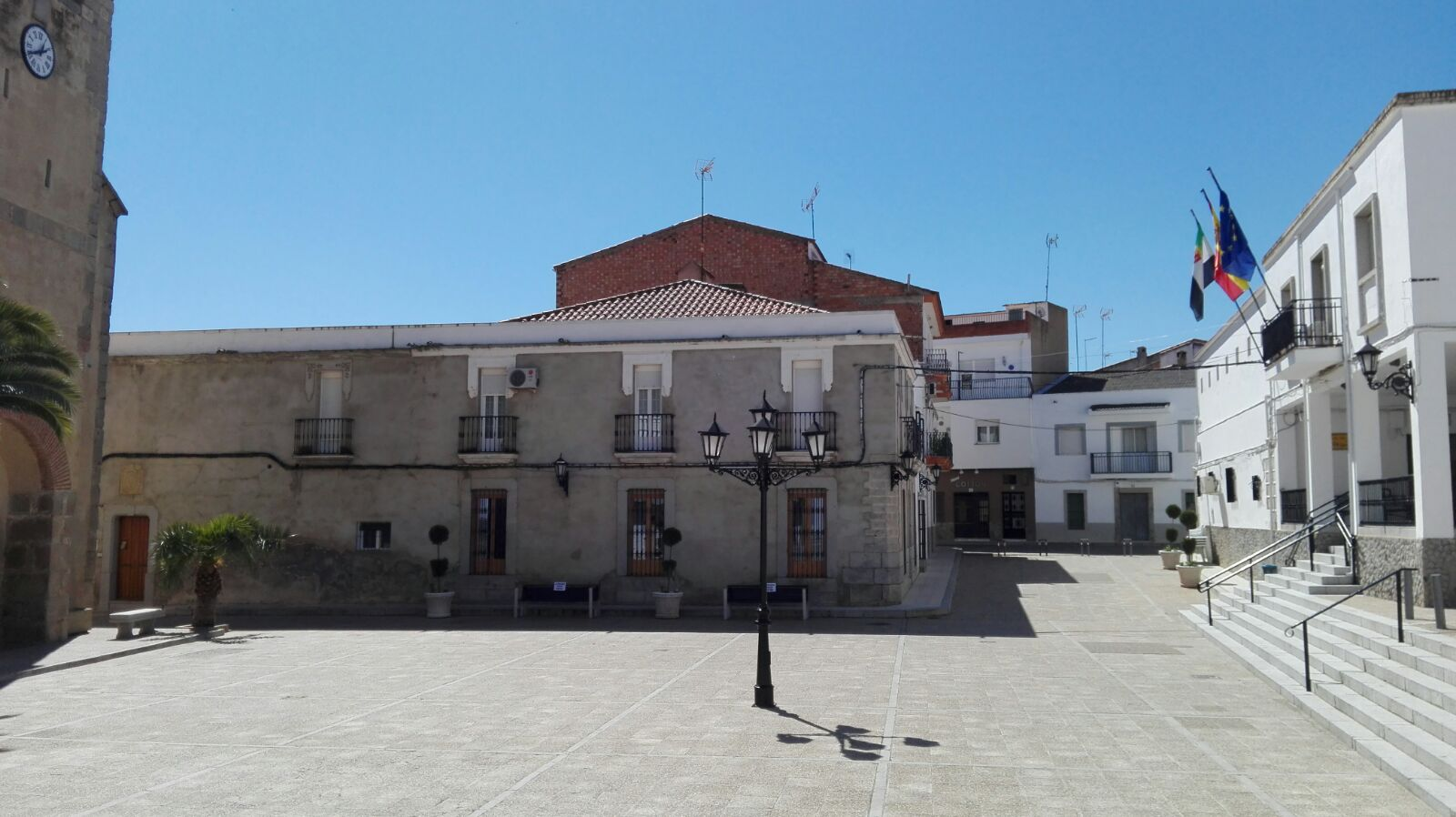

- Flag

- Location of Esparragosa de Lares within Extremadura
- Coordinates: 38°58′32″N 5°16′13″W
- Country: Spain
- Autonomous Community: Extremadura
- Province: Badajoz
- Comarca: La Siberia

Government
  - Mayor: Fernando García Arévalo (PP-EU)

Area
  - Total: 207 km^{2} (80 sq mi)
- Elevation (AMSL): 473 m (1,552 ft)

Population (2025-01-01)
  - Total: 839
  - Density: 4.05/km^{2} (10.5/sq mi)
- Time zone: UTC+1 (CET)
  - Summer (DST): UTC+2 (CEST (GMT +2))
- Postal code: 06620
- Area code: +34 (Spain) + 924 (Badajoz)

Esparragosa de Lares is a municipality in the province of Badajoz, Extremadura, Spain. It has a population of 1,066 and an area of 209 km^{2} (81 sq mi).

== See also ==
- List of municipalities in Badajoz
