= Peloche (Herrera del Duque) =

- Village
- Location within Extremadura Location within Spain
- Coordinates: 39°11′11″N 5°8′13″W
- Country: Spain
- Autonomous community: Extremadura
- Province: Province of Badajoz
- Municipality: Herrera del Duque
- Elevation: 397 m (1,302 ft)

Population
  - Total: 208
- Postal code: 06679
- Website: https://www.peloche.es

Peloche is a village located in the municipality of Herrera del Duque, in Badajoz province, Extremadura, Spain. As of 2020, it has a population of 208.

== Geography ==
Peloche is located 180km east-northeast of Badajoz.
