= Herrera del Duque =

- Flag Coat of arms

- Location of Herrera del Duque within Extremadura
- Coordinates: 39°10′7″N 5°3′4″W
- Country: Spain
- Autonomous community: Extremadura
- Province: Badajoz
- Comarca: La Siberia

Government
  - Mayor: Saturnino Alcázar Vaquerizo

Area
  - Total: 277.3 km^{2} (107.1 sq mi)
- Elevation: 468 m (1,535 ft)

Population (2025-01-01)
  - Total: 3,385
  - Density: 12.21/km^{2} (31.62/sq mi)
- Demonym: Herrereños
- Time zone: UTC+1 (CET)
  - Summer (DST): UTC+2 (CEST)
- Postal code.: 06670
- Website: Official website

Herrera del Duque (Extremaduran: Herrera del Duqui) is a municipality located in the province of Badajoz, Extremadura, Spain. As of 2010, the municipality has a population of 3681 inhabitants.

The town is commanded by a 15th-16th-century fortress-castle. Other sights include the church of St. John the Baptist and the hermitage of Nuestra Señora de Consolación.

Historically, there was a Jewish community in Herrera del Duque. After the expulsion of the Jews, many Jews in the town became conversos rather than flee Spain.

== Villages ==
The municipality includes the village of Peloche, located at 8 km from the town, with a population of 235 inhabitants according to the 2009 census.

== Notable people ==
- Inés Esteban (1488-1500), Spanish-Jewish conversa who was considered a prophetess at the age of 11 before being executed by Spanish authorities
- Juan de Herrera (1530-1597), Spanish architect, mathematician, and geometrician

== Gallery ==
Sights
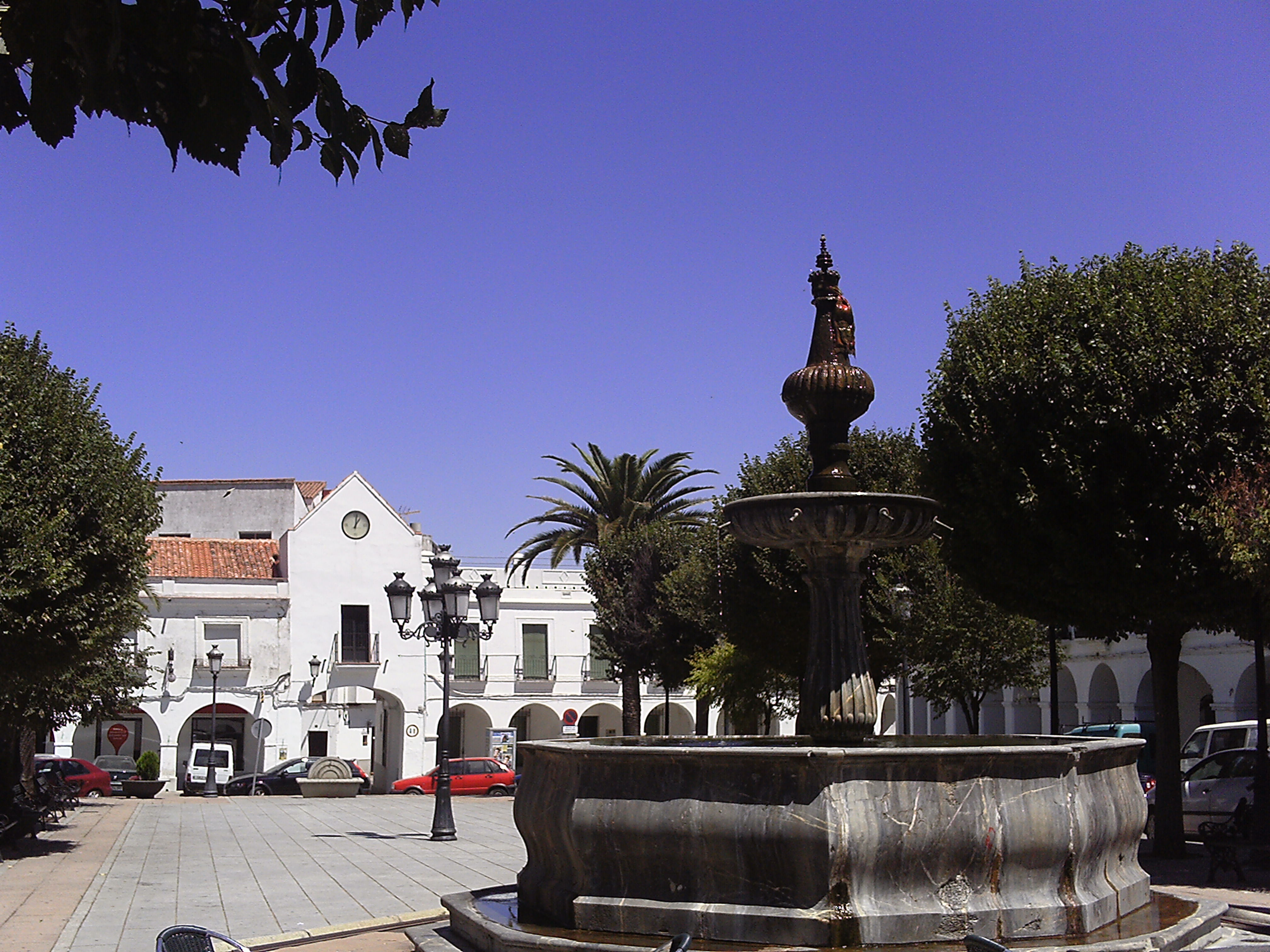
Plaza de España in Herrera del Duque

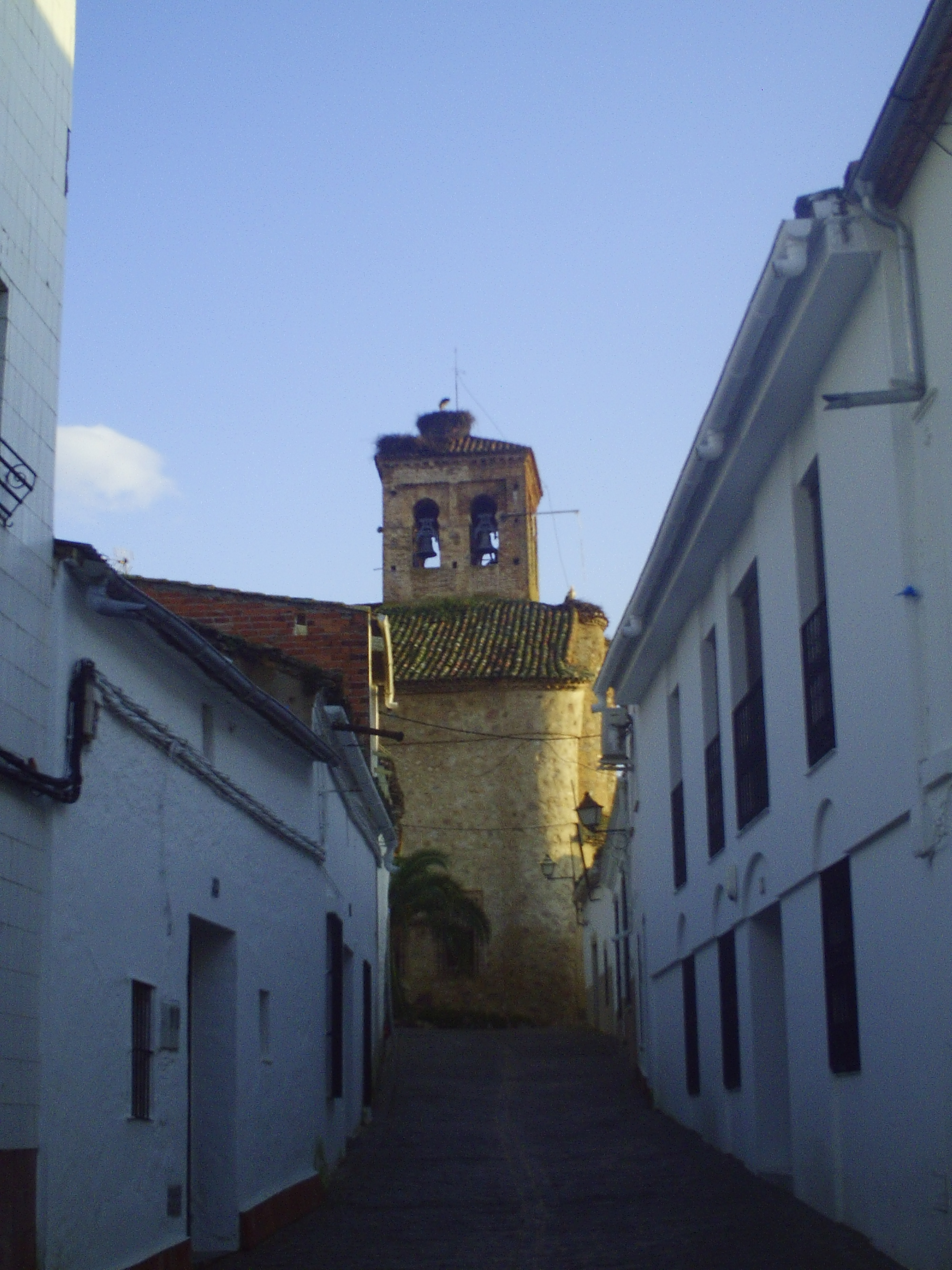
Church tower in Herrera del Duque

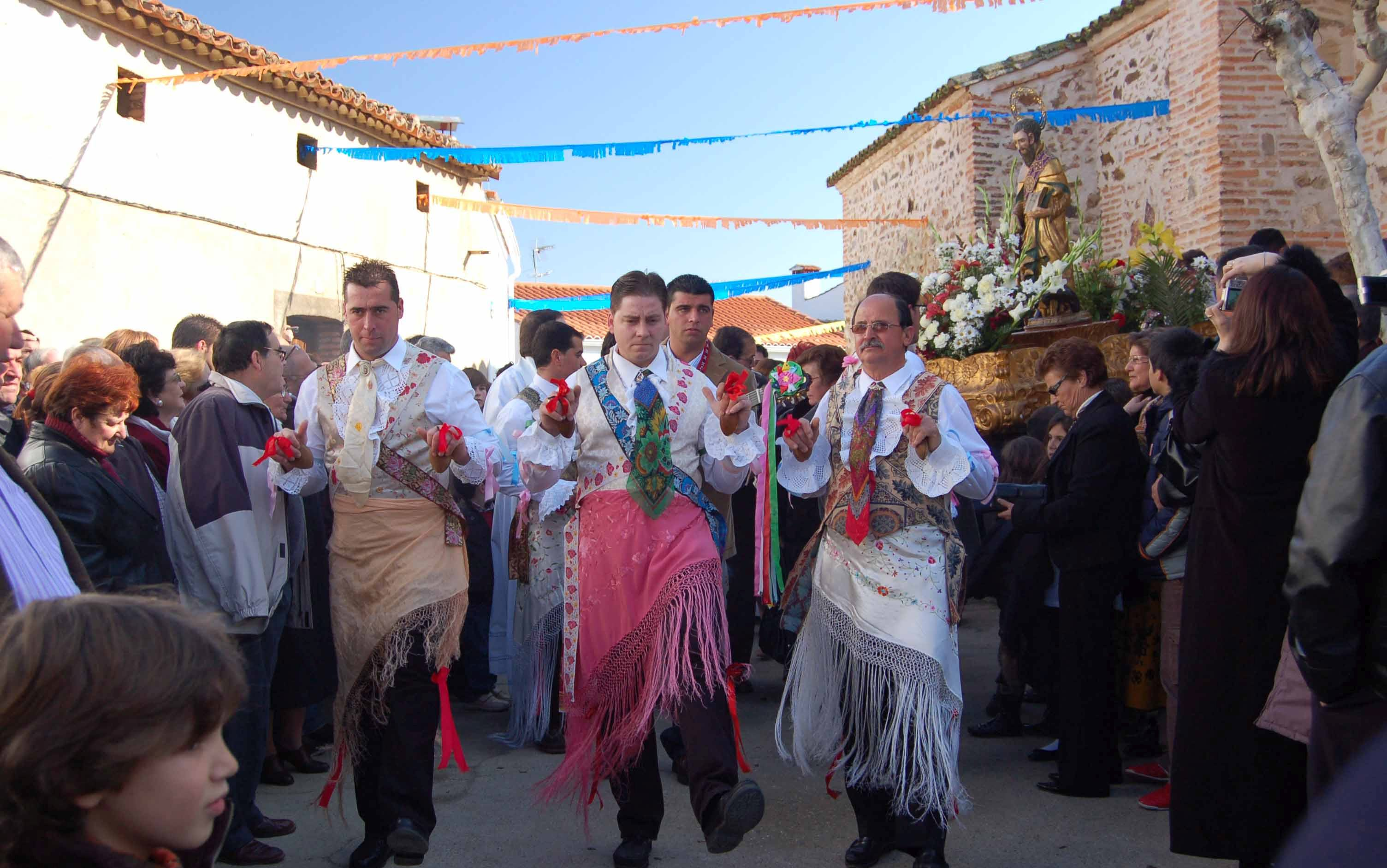
San Antón celebrations in Peloche

== See also ==
- List of municipalities in Badajoz
