= Inés Esteban =

Spanish-Jewish conversa

Inés Esteban (1488-1500), also known as Inés of Herrera, was a Spanish-Jewish conversa who, at the age of 11, was considered a prophetess before being executed by the Spanish Inquisition authorities.

== Biography ==
Inés Esteban was born around 1488 in the town of Herrera del Duque, in the Province of Badajoz in Western Spain. Inés' father was Juan Esteban, a shoemaker and tanner. Her mother, whose name is unknown, died when Ines was little. Juan Esteban remarried to a woman named Beatriz Ramírez. Ines and her family were conversos, Spanish Jews who converted to Catholicism to avoid persecution, but in some cases continued to practice Judaism in secret. In August 1499, at the age of 11, Inés was treated as a prophetess by the Jewish conversos of Herrera. Her life as a mystical leader was short-lived as the Spanish Inquisition authorities soon put Inés on trial and burned her at the stake.
