= Casas de Don Pedro =

- Municipality
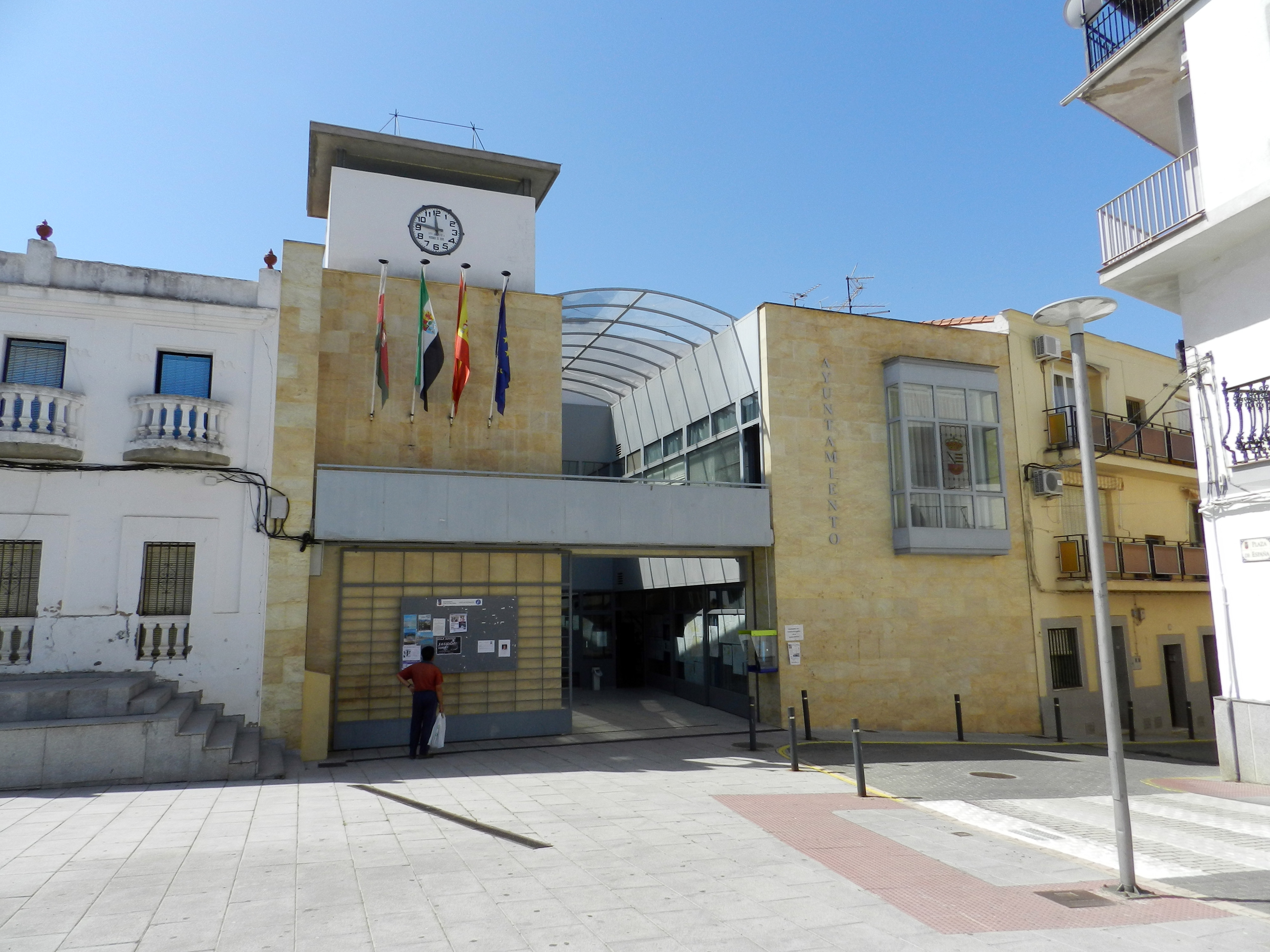
- Town hall

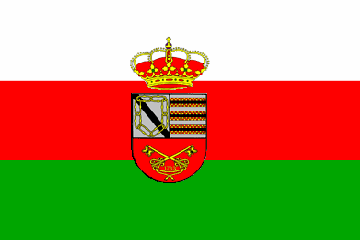
- Flag Coat of arms

- Location of Casas de Don Pedro within Extremadura
- Coordinates: 39°6′20″N 5°19′51″W
- Country: Spain
- Autonomous community: Extremadura
- Province: Badajoz
- Comarca: La Siberia

Area
  - Total: 142 km^{2} (55 sq mi)
- Elevation: 386 m (1,266 ft)

Population (2025-01-01)
  - Total: 1,375
  - Density: 9.68/km^{2} (25.1/sq mi)
- Time zone: UTC+1 (CET)
  - Summer (DST): UTC+2 (CEST)

Casas de Don Pedro, meaning 'Lord Peter's houses', is a municipality located in the province of Badajoz, Extremadura, Spain. According to the 2014 census, the municipality has a population of 1559 inhabitants.

== History ==
At the time of the Spanish Civil War the Francoist concentration camp of Casa Zaldívar, where Spanish Republican military personnel were interned and where many were shot, was located in a cortijo of this municipality.

== See also ==
- La Siberia
- List of municipalities in Badajoz
