= Garlitos =

- municipality
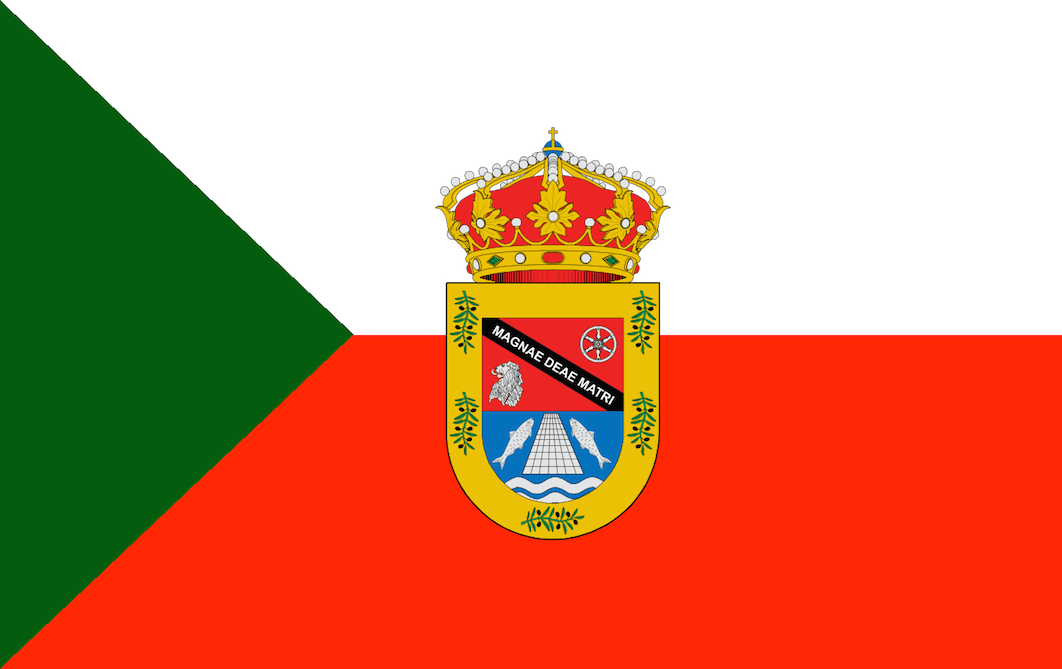
- Flag Coat of arms

- Location of Garlitos within Extremadura
- Coordinates: 38°52′48″N 5°2′53″W
- Country: Spain
- Autonomous community: Extremadura
- Province: Badajoz
- Municipality: Garlitos

Area
  - Total: 129 km^{2} (50 sq mi)
- Elevation: 554 m (1,818 ft)

Population (2025-01-01)
  - Total: 510
  - Density: 4.0/km^{2} (10/sq mi)
- Time zone: UTC+1 (CET)
  - Summer (DST): UTC+2 (CEST)

Garlitos is a municipality located in the province of Badajoz, Extremadura, Spain. As of 2018, the municipality has a population of 599 inhabitants.

== See also ==
- List of municipalities in Badajoz
