= Fuenlabrada de los Montes =

Settlement in Badajoz Province, Spain

- Municipality
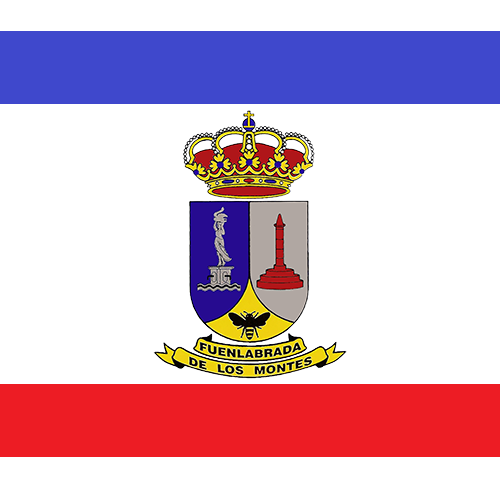
- Flag Coat of arms

- Location of Fuenlabrada de los Montes within Extremadura
- Coordinates: 39°7′54″N 4°56′8″W
- Country: Spain
- Autonomous Community: Extremadura
- Province: Badajoz
- Comarca: Cíjara

Government
  - Mayor: Ismael Higuera Clemente (PSOE)

Area
  - Total: 192 km^{2} (74 sq mi)
- Elevation (AMSL): 539 m (1,768 ft)

Population (2025-01-01)
  - Total: 1,693
  - Density: 8.82/km^{2} (22.8/sq mi)
- Time zone: UTC+1 (CET)
  - Summer (DST): UTC+2 (CEST (GMT +2))
- Postal code: 06660
- Area code: +34 (Spain) + 924 (Badajoz)

Fuenlabrada de los Montes is a municipality in the province of Badajoz, Extremadura, Spain.

In 2000, the municipality had 67 plant species.

== Notable people ==
- Mercedes Barba Álvarez (1923–2018), Naïvist

== See also ==
- List of municipalities in Badajoz
