= Sancti-Spíritus, Badajoz =

Sancti-Spíritus
- Municipality
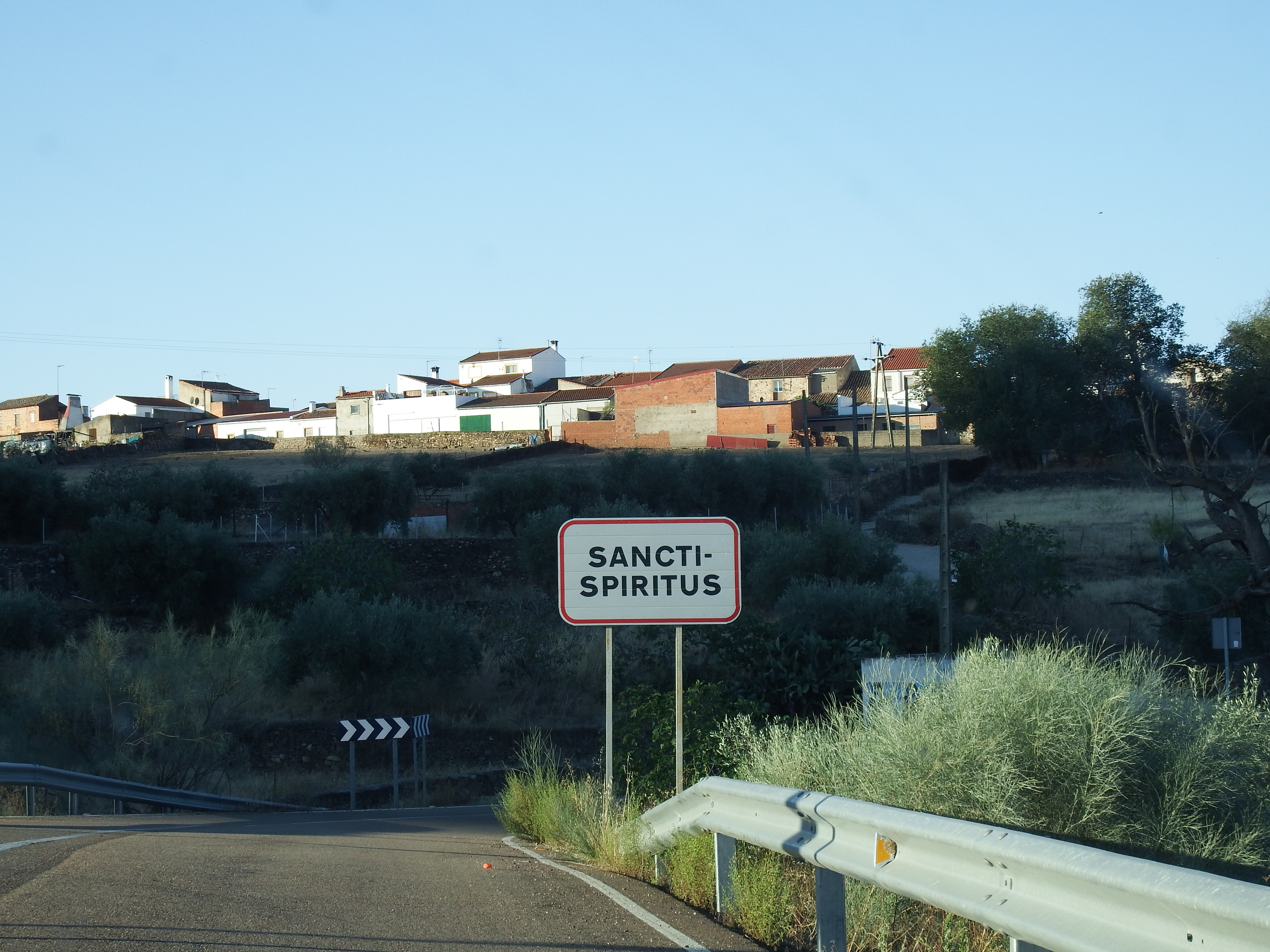

- Coat of arms

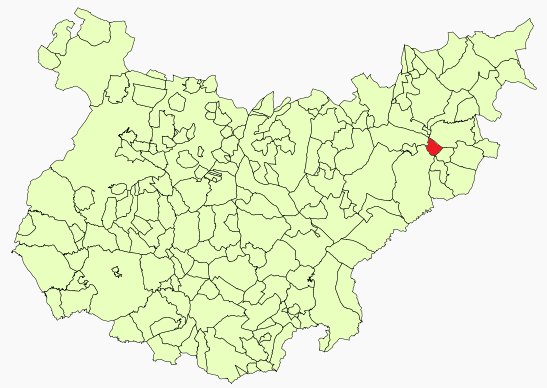
- location of Santi-Spíritus in the province of Badajoz

- Location in Spain
- Coordinates: 38°55′30″N 5°8′50″W
- Country: Spain
- Autonomous community: Extremadura
- Province: Badajoz
- Comarca: La Serena

Government
  - Alcalde: Francisco Javier Sánchez Caballero

Area
  - Total: 33.56 km^{2} (12.96 sq mi)
- Elevation: 485 m (1,591 ft)

Population (2025-01-01)
  - Total: 141
  - Density: 4.20/km^{2} (10.9/sq mi)
- Time zone: UTC+1 (CET)
  - Summer (DST): UTC+2 (CEST)

Sancti-Spíritus is a municipality in the province of Badajoz, Extremadura, Spain. According to the 2014 census, the municipality has a population of 222 inhabitants.

A great part of the town's municipal term is submerged under the La Serena Reservoir, one of the largest in Spain.

== See also ==
- La Serena
- List of municipalities in Badajoz
