= Garbayuela =

- Location of Garbayuela within Extremadura
- Coordinates: 39°2′56″N 5°00′2″W
- Country: Spain
- Autonomous community: Extremadura
- Province: Badajoz
- Municipality: Garbayuela

Area
  - Total: 84 km^{2} (32 sq mi)
- Elevation: 487 m (1,598 ft)

Population (2025-01-01)
  - Total: 450
  - Density: 5.4/km^{2} (14/sq mi)
- Time zone: UTC+1 (CET)
  - Summer (DST): UTC+2 (CEST)

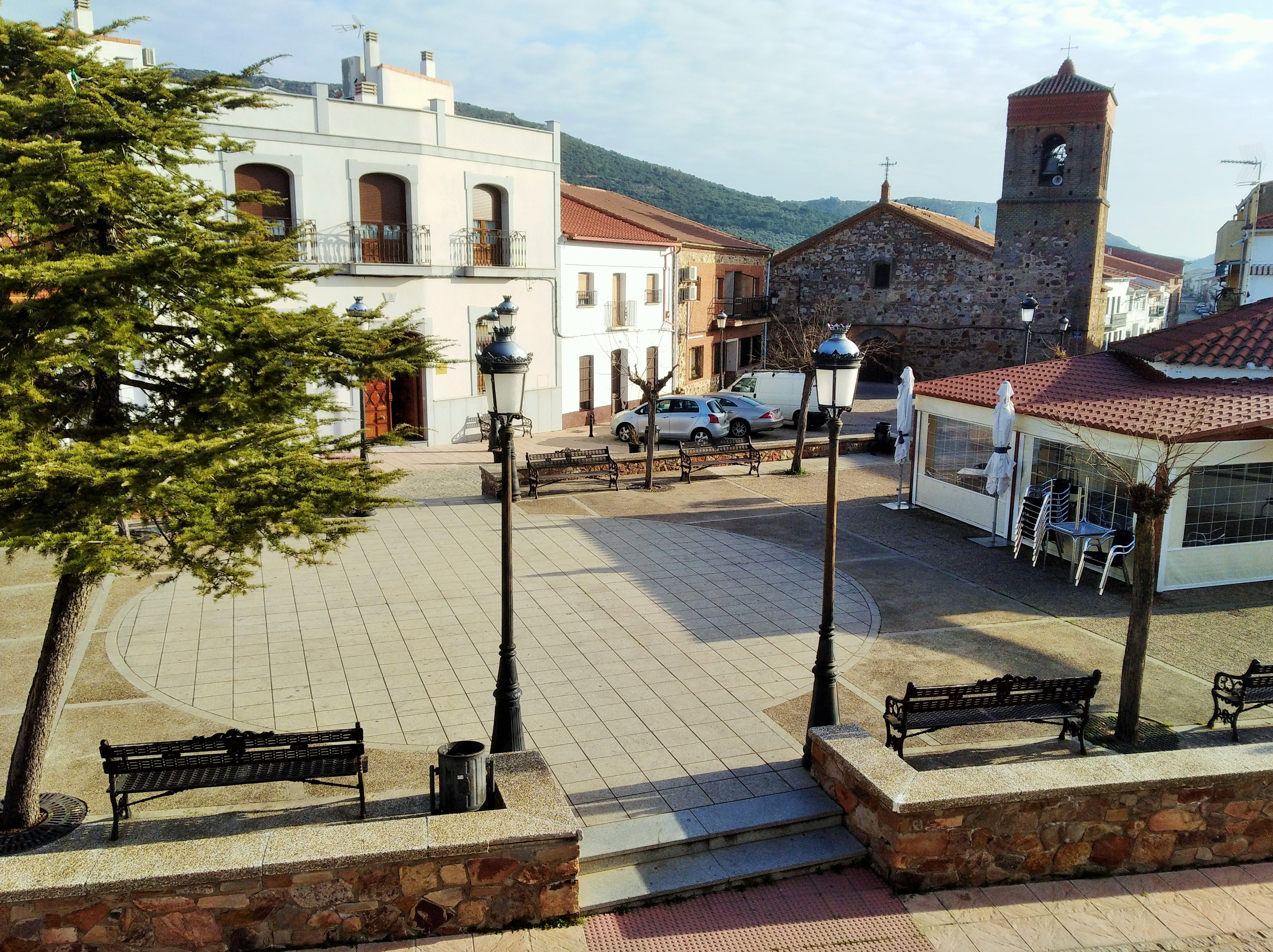
Constitution Square where the town hall and the parish church are located

Garbayuela (Spanish pronunciation: [ɡaɾ.βaˈʝwe.la]) is a municipality located in the province of Badajoz, Extremadura, Spain. According to the 2006 census (INE), the municipality had a population of 531.

== See also ==
- List of municipalities in Badajoz
