= Baterno =

- municipality
- Flag Coat of arms

- Location of Baterno within Extremadura
- Coordinates: 38°57′24″N 4°54′41″W
- Country: Spain
- Autonomous community: Extremadura
- Province: Badajoz
- Municipality: Baterno

Area
  - Total: 62.1 km^{2} (24.0 sq mi)
- Elevation: 561 m (1,841 ft)

Population (2025-01-01)
  - Total: 231
  - Density: 3.72/km^{2} (9.63/sq mi)
- Time zone: UTC+1 (CET)
  - Summer (DST): UTC+2 (CEST)

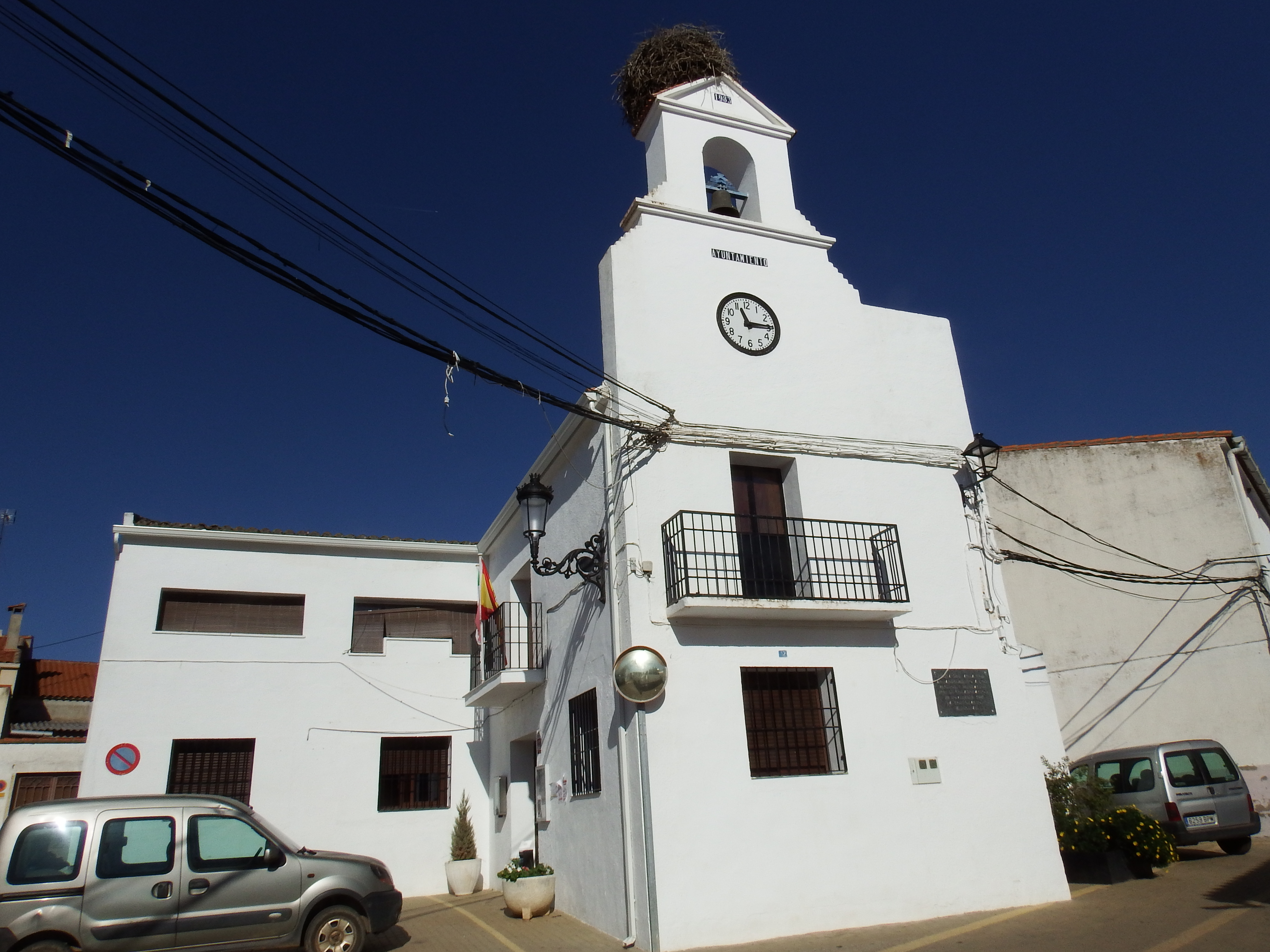
Townhall of Baterno

Baterno is a municipality located in the province of Badajoz, Extremadura, Spain. According to the 2007 census (INE), the municipality has a population of 391 inhabitants.

== See also ==
- List of municipalities in Badajoz
