= Siruela =

- municipality
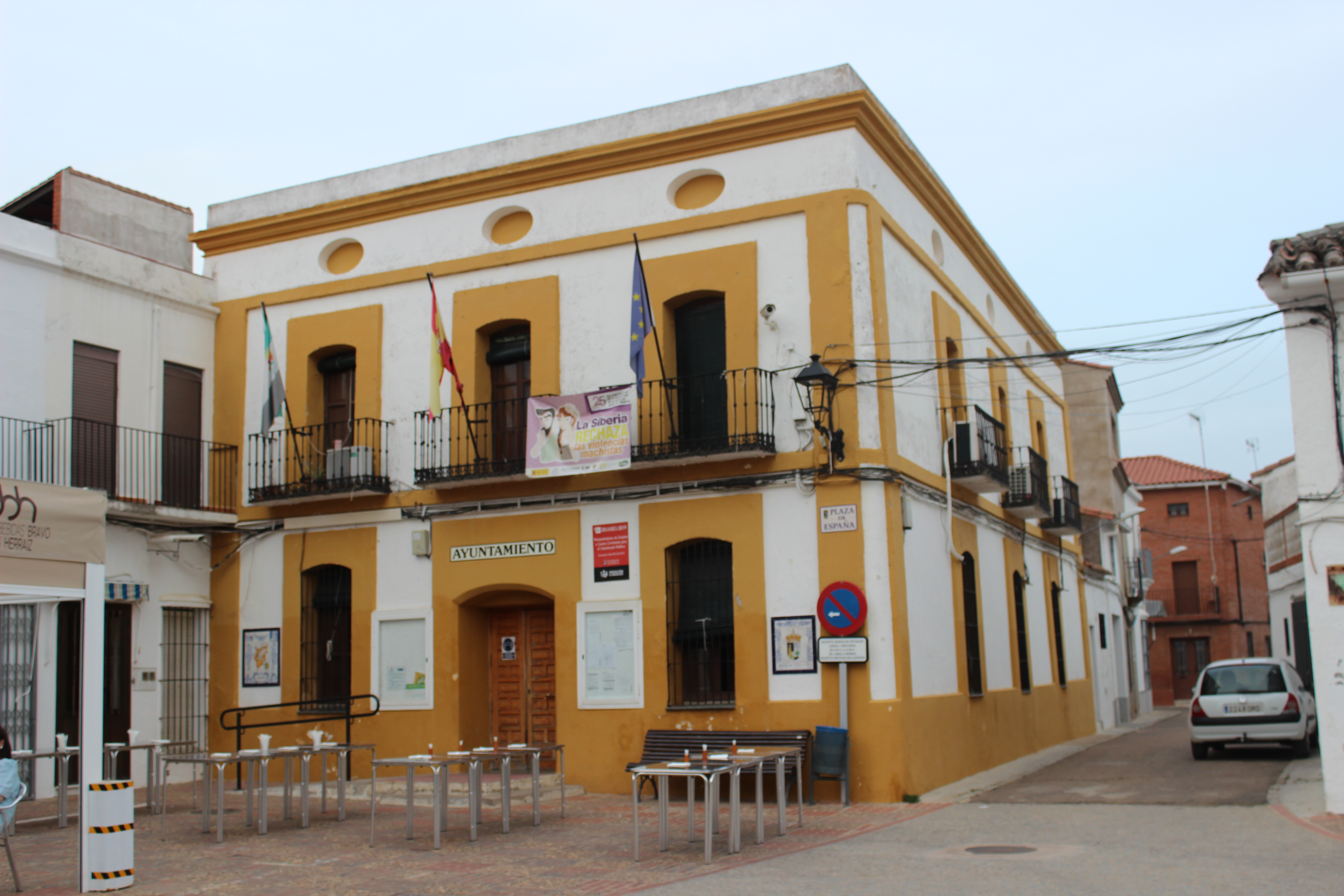
- Town hall

- Coat of arms

- Location of Siruela within Extremadura
- Coordinates: 38°58′39″N 5°2′57″W
- Country: Spain
- Autonomous community: Extremadura
- Province: Badajoz

Area
  - Total: 202 km^{2} (78 sq mi)
- Elevation: 519 m (1,703 ft)

Population (2025-01-01)
  - Total: 1,766
  - Density: 8.74/km^{2} (22.6/sq mi)
- Time zone: UTC+1 (CET)
  - Summer (DST): UTC+2 (CEST)

Siruela is a municipality located in the province of Badajoz, Extremadura, Spain. According to the 2006 census (INE), the municipality has a population of 2,214 inhabitants.

== See also ==
- List of municipalities in Badajoz
