= Tamurejo =

- Municipality
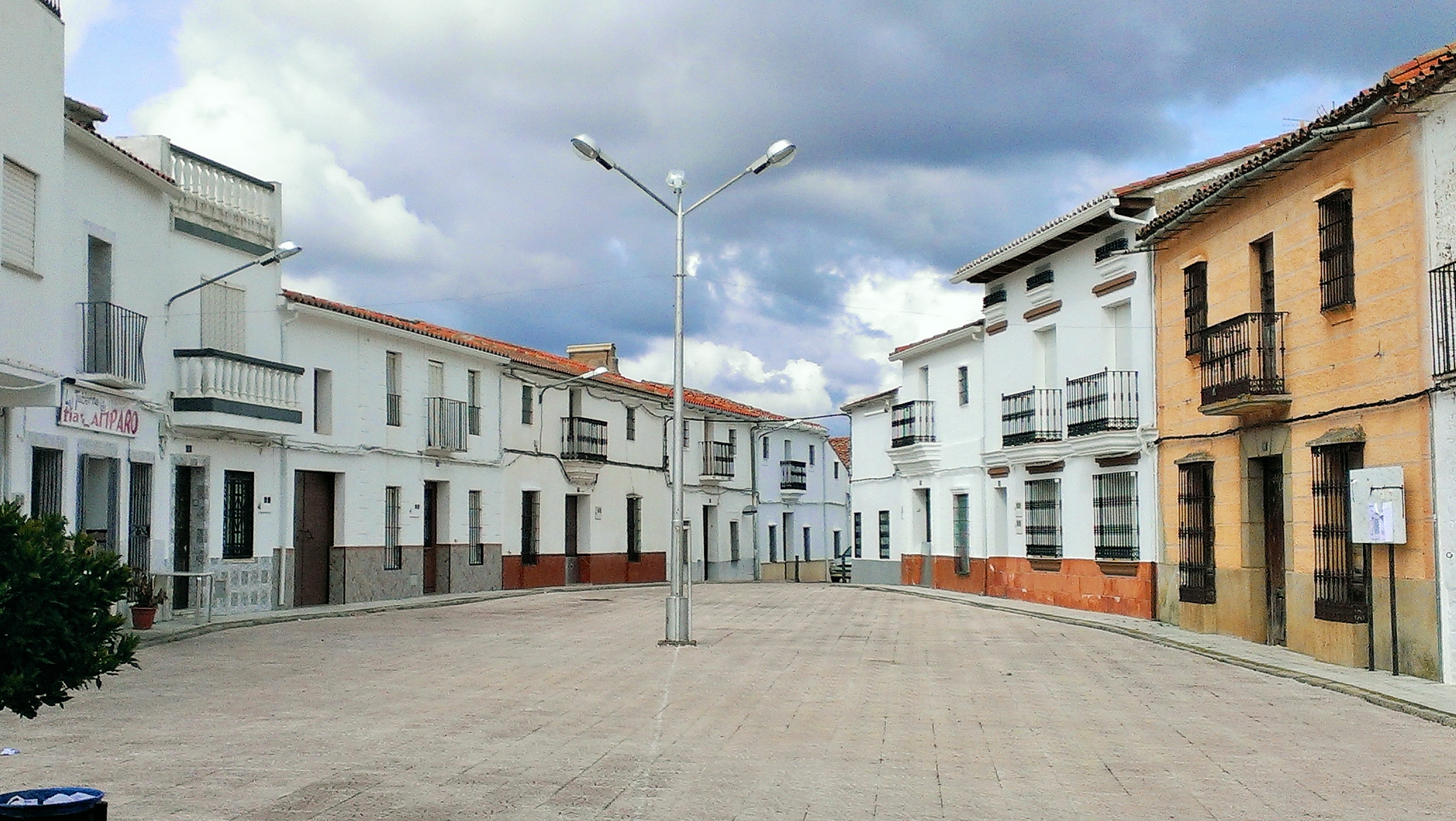

- Coat of arms
- Interactive map of Tamurejo
- Coordinates: 38°59′N 04°56′W
- Country: Spain
- Autonomous community: Extremadura
- Province: Badajoz

Area
  - Total: 30 km^{2} (12 sq mi)
- Elevation: 547 m (1,795 ft)

Population (2025-01-01)
  - Total: 190
  - Density: 6.3/km^{2} (16/sq mi)
- Time zone: UTC+1 (CET)
  - Summer (DST): UTC+2 (CEST)

Tamurejo is a municipality located in the province of Badajoz, Extremadura, Spain. According to the 2006 census (INE), the municipality has a population of 265 inhabitants.

== See also ==
- List of municipalities in Badajoz
