= Helechosa de los Montes =

- municipality
- Coat of arms

- Location of Helechosa de los Montes within Extremadura
- Coordinates: 39°18′42″N 4°54′33″W
- Country: Spain
- Autonomous community: Extremadura
- Province: Badajoz
- Municipality: Helechosa de los Montes

Area
  - Total: 377 km^{2} (146 sq mi)
- Elevation: 356 m (1,168 ft)

Population (2025-01-01)
  - Total: 556
  - Density: 1.47/km^{2} (3.82/sq mi)
- Time zone: UTC+1 (CET)
  - Summer (DST): UTC+2 (CEST)

Helechosa de los Montes is a municipality in the province of Badajoz, Extremadura, Spain. According to the 2021 census (INE), It has a population of 612 inhabitants and an area of 309 km^{2}.

== See also ==
- List of municipalities in Badajoz
