= Las Vegas Altas =

Coordinates: 38°57′N 5°51′W

- Comarca
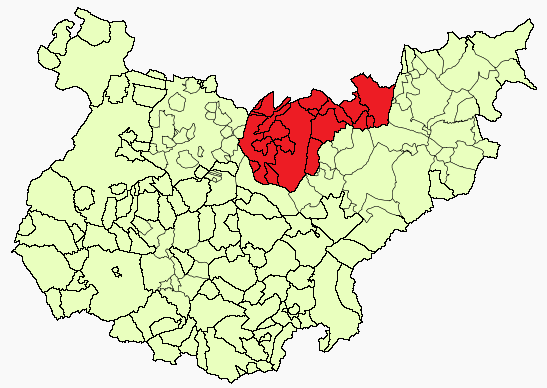
- Location in the province of Badajoz
- Country: Spain
- Autonomous community: Extremadura
- Province: Badajoz
- Capital: Don Benito
- Municipalities: List: Acedera, Cristina, Don Benito, Guareña, La Haba, Manchita, Medellín, Mengabril, Navalvillar de Pela, Orellana de la Sierra, Orellana la Vieja, Rena, Santa Amalia, Valdetorres, Villanueva de la Serena, Villar de Rena

Area
  - Total: 1,841.40 km^{2} (710.97 sq mi)

Population (2015)
  - Total: 90,697
  - Density: 49.254/km^{2} (127.57/sq mi)
- Time zone: UTC+1 (CET)
  - Summer (DST): UTC+2 (CEST)
- Largest municipality: Don Benito

Las Vegas Altas, also known as Vegas Altas del Guadiana, is a comarca in the province of Badajoz, Extremadura, Spain. Its capital and administrative center is the urban area of the municipalities of Don Benito and Villanueva de la Serena. The comarca contains 16 municipalities and 90,697 inhabitants (INE 2008).

Las Vegas Altas borders a number of comarcas within Badajoz province: Tierra de Trujillo to the north; Villuercas to the northeast; La Siberia to the southeast; La Serena to the south; and Tierra de Mérida - Vegas Bajas to the southwest.
