= Tierra de Barros =

Coordinates: 38°41′N 6°24′W

- Comarca
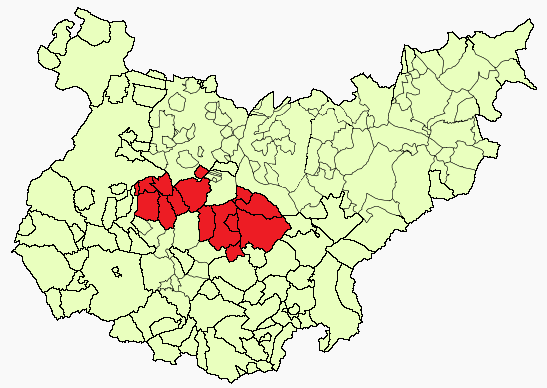
- Location in the province of Badajoz
- Country: Spain
- Autonomous community: Extremadura
- Province: Badajoz
- Capital: Almendralejo

Area
  - Total: 1,419 km^{2} (548 sq mi)

Population (2015)
  - Total: 74,872
  - Density: 52.76/km^{2} (136.7/sq mi)
- Time zone: UTC+1 (CET)
  - Summer (DST): UTC+2 (CEST)

Tierra de Barros is a comarca in the province of Badajoz, Extremadura, Spain. Its capital and administrative center is Almendralejo. The comarca contains 15 municipalities and 74,872 inhabitants (INE 2008).

== Municipalities ==
- Aceuchal
- Almendralejo
- Corte de Peleas
- Entrín Bajo
- Hinojosa del Valle
- Hornachos
- Palomas
- Puebla de la Reina
- Puebla del Prior
- Ribera del Fresno
- Santa Marta
- Solana de los Barros
- Torremejía
- Villafranca de los Barros
- Villalba de los Barros

== Economy ==
Tierra de Barros is a wine growing region, particularly for Cayetana grapes. It is one of the regions were Ribera del Guadiana DOC wine is produced.
