= Cordobilla de Lácara =

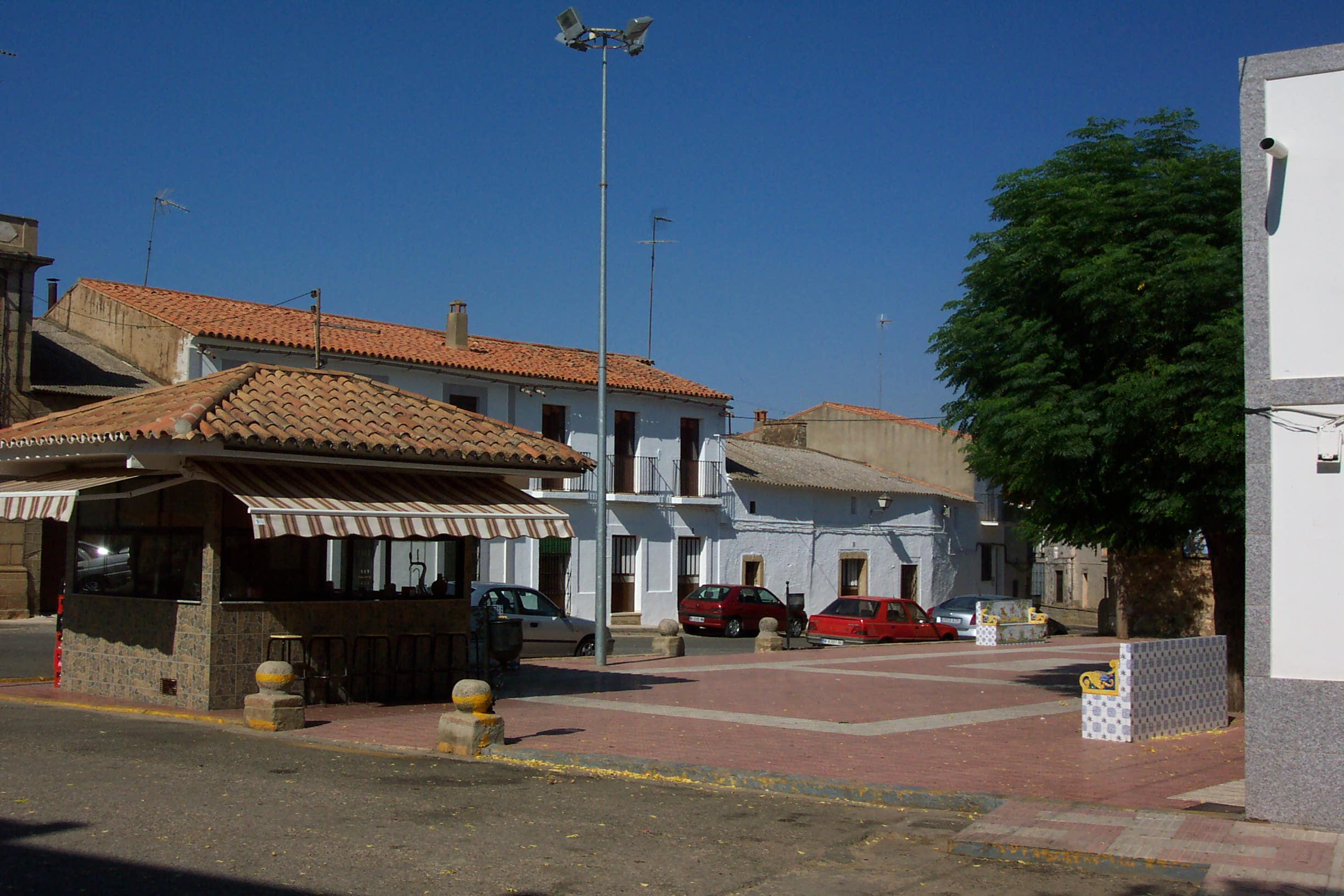
- Town plaza

- Coat of arms

- Location of Cordobilla de Lácara within Extremadura
- Coordinates: 39°8′54″N 6°26′15″W
- Country: Spain
- Autonomous community: Extremadura
- Province: Badajoz
- Municipality: Cordobilla de Lácara

Government
  - Mayor: Antonio Cruz Collado (IPEX)

Area
  - Total: 37 km^{2} (14 sq mi)
- Elevation: 361 m (1,184 ft)

Population (2025-01-01)
  - Total: 815
  - Density: 22/km^{2} (57/sq mi)
- Time zone: UTC+1 (CET)
  - Summer (DST): UTC+2 (CEST)
- Website: www.cordobilladelacara.es

Cordobilla de Lácara is a municipality located in the province of Badajoz, Extremadura, Spain. According to the 2005 census (INE), the municipality has a population of 1023 inhabitants.

== Status ==
Cordobilla de Lácara is situated in the foothills of the Sierra de San Pedro, surrounded by meadows and olive groves, which provide the main means of work and economy to the people of Cordobilla. The township borders the province of Cáceres and Mérida term. It belongs to the region of Tierra de Mérida - Vegas Low and judicial Party Montijo. It is part of the Commonwealth of Northern Lácara.

It is 44 km from Mérida. The nearest towns are La Nava de Santiago and Carmonita, which are 12 km and 9 km away, respectively.

== Geography ==
Cordobilla of Lácara sits on the Lácara River, a tributary of the Guadiana River.

To the south runs the river Lácara between pastures, olive groves and pastures. To the north is the foothills of the Sierra de San Pedro. To the east and west are pastures with oak trees between plains and mountains.

The climate features high temperatures in summer and low temperatures and rain in autumn and winter.

Species such as deer and wild boar live nearby, and other protected natural habitats are found here such as black vultures, golden eagles and imperial Iberian.

Except for the areas near the river, the land is unproductive, mostly clay, which does not allow intensive cultivation agriculture.

== Economy ==
Agriculture is the main means of livelihood. Livestock includes sheep, goats and pigs. Agricultural production is mainly based on olive oil extracted from olive groves, cereals and pastures.

Oil production revolves around the borders of the Country Co-operative Society "The Lácara", which brings together the vast majority of oil producers in the town, mostly olive smallholders.

Another major economic activity is "out of Cork" which takes place in the summer. Cork is produced by the numerous oaks of the Mediterranean forest parkland of Lácara Cordobilla. Extremadura is the leading producer of cork in Spain due to the Mediterranean forest in the area.

== Etymology ==
The etymological origin of Lácara Cordobilla from Arabic, in association with the first settlements before the victory. His name is associated with the city of Córdoba, as the nearest town (Carmonita to 11 miles away. Later it was conquered by the Order of Santiago, and became a dependency of Mérida, a city near you.

Assuming birth to the Muslim way of the Iberian Peninsula, would be under the mandate of the capital (current Badajoz) whose first caliph was Ibn Marwan al-Chilliqui. In this first time the caliphate was very independent of Cordoba, which became part years later.

After the disintegration of the Caliphate, capital of Badajoz was one of the largest taifas Peninsula (independent to 1022), the Taifa of Badajoz, playing an important role as a cultural center at the time, mainly during aftasíes government.

The town sits beside the River Lácara, hence the name of the town, a tributary of the Guadiana River.

For years the prevailing idea that Cordovilla written with V because it was thought that the etymology came from Cordo and Villa.

It is still difficult to know what the real etymology, and in recent times is believed more closely related to the Arab and Andalusian city of Cordoba. Although no documents or research to prove either theory.

== History ==
In the fall of the ancien regime is constituted Cordobilla constitutional municipality in the region of Extremadura. From 1834 became part of the judicial district of Mérida. [1] In the 1842 census had 99 households and 340 residents.

=== Heritage ===
==== Dolmen ====
Near Cordobilla is the Dolmen of Lácara, an important megalithic construction, which could be the biggest in Europe that is known of its time.

The Lácara dolmen is one of the largest megalithic monuments in Extremadura. Its state of preservation provides insight into the construction techniques used in regional megalithic architecture during the Neolithic and Chalcolithic periods..

The Lácara dolmen is a passage grave, an architectural jewel of the Paleolithic. It is situated in the middle of a pasture, among oaks, a few km from Mérida on the road from Aljucén to La Nava de Santiago.

The dolmen consists of a long covered walkway that leads to the burial chamber. This chamber is the dolmen's focus. Of the great stones that rose into the sky (the dome would be about 5 meters) there is only one intact, which gives an idea of the grandeur of the building. The remaining base demonstrates the precision with which the other stones were placed. The dome was closed on top with a slab, which is no longer in evidence. The entire structure was covered with earth and stones, forming a large mound. To strengthen and secure the tomb, large rocks were placed at the base, as a buttress along the outer ring. These stones are visible on the perimeter of the dolmen.

==== Traditional architecture ====
The houses have traditionally been whitewashed Extremadura being a typical landscape from white and red Arabic-style tile.

Traditional architecture is related to the environment and climate of the area, dry and hot in summer and cold and wet in winter and autumn. Just as the subsistence economy of the time.

The typical houses are built around a hallway, usually paved for the passage of cattle to the yard or patio. Rooms are located to sleep on both sides of the aisle if they are whole houses or just one side if you are average. Widen the corridor just in a space dedicated to the kitchen and day room lit by the adjacent patio. In this room the main element is the Spanish fireplace around which life flowed. In the latter part of the house lies the patio or yard ("Run" in popular terminology) which could also accommodate cattle estancias. Overnight stays no natural light except those facing the street.

The smaller homes have only one plant and some bent at its top, which was once for the storage of fodder and feed for livestock.

Only a few typical buildings exceed two storeys with habitable floor in the first floor. In addition we find a middle ground space for other uses such as warehouses, barns and stables, and some residences with kitchens not contiguous to the main dwelling, but the courtyard surroundings. Many homes have two entrances, one main vivideras areas and a secondary (known as "door") to the backyard, stable or barn, often in different streets, and many others in the same.

The construction methodology is based on bearing walls of stone and adobe, with vertical holes in the facade, these walls are often shared party walls between adjoining dwellings. The walls are white, using traditional methods of lime. In general, the architecture is devoid of frills beyond certain gaps racks. The gaps are always traditional vertical proportions, even when small in size for reasons of privacy. Traditional roofing tiles are baked red clay.

Urbanistically lacks any plan for growth given the age of the first settlements. So originally the town grew up around the church and continued in a broad street parallel to the river Lácara. The housing plan unequal forms mingle with pens and building spaces as a patchwork tapestry.

Note the good preservation of gates and grids that provide a traditional character to the urban.

Still preserved wells and batteries that once Water Supplies neighbors and Cordobilla cattle. Highlights the Power of Madroñal.

==== Church of St. Peter ====
The church of St. Peter the Apostle, in the Archdiocese of Mérida-Badajoz. Located in the town square, the 15th century, subsequently subjected to many changes, the last few years ago. It consists of nave with square head with dome. Its contents include an invoice archaic carving representing San Juan Bautista, datable in the 16th century. Also highlight the wood carvings of San Justo y San Pastor (The Santitos) of S. XVI, recently restored, which since its development in this century have not left the village church in any way to the construction in the 1960s of the chapel, which leads them on the first Sunday of May in the procession to offer mass. Currently in the parish church after restoration.

==== Ermita de San Justo y San Pastor ====
The newly built chapel, is situated right on the edge of the provinces of Cáceres and Badajoz, in the Cerro El Santo in the private property of Square-El Santo.

Built in 1965, the chapel was projected to average about lack of money. In the foothills of the hill on which it sits is made the pilgrimage in honor of the patron (The Santitos) the first Sunday in May since its construction in 1965 with the explicit permission of the owners of the farm. At the start made the pilgrimage to the mid-60's after the construction of the chapel was left to celebrate the traditional "Compadre Thursday, the party gradually being replaced by the celebration of the new pilgrimage. You can access it only that day to celebrate the Holy Mass in honor of San Justo y San Pastor prior to the festival of the pilgrimage.

The church of San Justo y San Pastor lacks any historical value due to its recent construction in 1965, and its poor architecture is superseded by the beautiful surroundings in which they settle. At the foot of Cerro del Santo (who share the private estates of El Castillo de Castellanos (CC) and The Saint, The Square (BA)) and on which the building stands, is the reservoir Oven Tejero, which enriches the landscape, flora and fauna of the meadow that surrounds it.

The chapel is the factory of stones and mortar, square and hip roof of red clay tiles. Closed for almost complete, in the west wall opens a big hole with iron gate in the north and south sides only a few small circular windows. In their access (West) also covers stone and mortar slab bounded on the north by a factory that culminates in a small bell tower with no access.

To access this new building on top of the hill among rocks and thickets the owners of the El Cuadrao "The Holy blazed a new path through the undergrowth in a private capacity, but allows the pilgrims and faithful on the first Sunday in May each year to access the new chapel to celebrate Mass in honor of the child martyrs, prior to the pilgrimage which takes place on that farm.

== Demographics ==
Today the population is 1,009 inhabitants, although in the past, prior to emigration were rural Extremadura in the 1960s, was over 2,000.

In recent years we have been observing a certain demographic rates stabilized, the population remained constant.

Detriment of small towns like Cordobilla of Lácara are the major towns or cities, such as Cáceres, Badajoz and Mérdia which currently houses a population of smaller towns that come in search of work.

The next migration, different from that experienced in the 1960s (where the target was more distant regions and prolific, and Central European countries like Germany and France, allows a floating population increases on weekends and in summers.

== Reservoirs ==
In late 1970 the construction of two reservoirs was approved in the National Hydrological Plan of Cordobilla de Lácara along the Rio Lácara and one of its tributaries. These reservoirs, Embalse de Horno Tejero and Embalse del Boquerón, opened in 1985. These projects have changed the original landscape; they appear as two large lakes in the midst of the pastures nearby. The reservoirs provide water to the Commonwealth of the Northern Lácara, of which Lácara Cordobilla is a part. They are not navigable and bathing is prohibited. The main fish are carp, pike and black bass.

Both reservoirs, despite their proximity to Cordobilla de Lácara, also cross the city limits of the towns of Mérida and Caceres.

The reservoirs of Horno Tejero and Boqueron have contributed to the emergence of new flora and fauna that was not native to the area, thus enriching the abundant natural variety that already existed prior to construction of the dams. They have also encouraged new activities in the area such as fishing and hiking.

== Culture ==
GastronomíaTexto in italics See also: Cuisine of the province of Badajoz

Typical dishes: boiled Extremadura, lamb stew, gazpacho and crumbs Extremadura Extremadura. Highlights the typical slaughter, from where the typical meats like sausage, pork, sausage, patatera, sausage and ham. The sweets are perrunillas, threads and bores lamp.

=== Festivals and traditions ===
==== Easter ====
Stored in the tradition of The Alabarderos, guarding the sacred images in these days and accompany the processions on Palm Sunday, Maundy Thursday, Good Friday and Easter Sunday.

==== The Pilgrimage ====
It is performed in the private property of Square-El Santo on the first Sunday of May, with prior permission of the owners of the property on which sits the shrine dedicated to the patron saints Justo and Pastor, children mártires. La pilgrimage begins to be held in 1965 coinciding with the completion of construction of the chapel that year and the realization by the owners of the farm road that gives access to it. Short tradition is that of Lácara Cordobilla chapel had never until then, no place where people make a pilgrimage as neighboring village, and because it was customary to celebrate the Compadre Thursday as family day in the field. This changed in the 1960s when it begins to curdle the idea of holding a popular pilgrimage, like the neighboring towns, in honor of the patron San Justo and San Pastor.

With permission of the owners, and to celebrate the pilgrimage every first Sunday in May, allowed the construction of the chapel in 1965, and access that day to the area reserved for pilgrims and the use of the access road. This allowed the idea of a popular pilgrimage was held in Cordobilla of Lácara.El day before the procession in the village festivities are celebrated as children's games, sack races, racing pigs, equestrian signs, etc. On Saturday night festival takes place in a crowded town square, where the images of San Justo y San Pastor presiding from the parish church of St. Peter the Apostle with open doors.

Already in the morning on the first Sunday of May, the Santitos are taken in his carriage through the streets decked out and the people followed the crowd and the band mass. About 9 am, surrounded by the faithful and pilgrims walk out of the chapel in the El Santo. Despite the 8 kilometers far from the village, the coach of child martyrs is followed by numerous faithful and pilgrims as well as horses and carriages that color theme to travel.

Arriving at the chapel at 12 am, Mass is offered to the pilgrims and the pilgrimage after it starts in the pasture, enlivened with a popular festival.

It is customary from the beginning that each family or group of several, to meet every one of them on a tree. Each group under a holm oak cone ce as "ranch" and are the basis of the pilgrimage, since there is neither permitted fairground booths and activities. The event runs from oak tree in the neighbors greeting, eating, drinking and dancing. At present this looks familiar in the pasture is maintained and encouraged, thus keeping Cordobilla pilgrimage traditional and authentic character.

With sunset around 8 pm, ends the pilgrimage and the pilgrims walk behind the hearse back to the Santitos between songs and music.

The responsibility and organization of events taking place as well as the preparation of images of the carriage that moves them, cleaning the chapel and the meadow after the pilgrimage, the popular festival is held, and acquiring necessary permissions rests with the Commission on the pilgrimage, an organization of neighborhood volunteers that members change every few years. This organization was founded with the pilgrimage in 1965.

The Commission on the pilgrimage to be a private non-governmental and devoid of any subsidy organizes events throughout the year to raise funds with which to maintain and the conclusion of the pilgrimage. Thanks to these volunteers and organizers that the party has endured, becoming increasingly important not only locally, but also local.

==== The Santitos ====
The Santitos are the festivities. The festivities run from 5 to 8 August, being the 6th day of The Santitos San Justo and San Pastor.

Formerly the day was celebrated on August 4 Cattle Fair, where locals and visitors buying and selling livestock. With the passage of time and the gradual abandonment of the traditional tillage, dependent animals, this show no longer held to be forgotten.

==== Christmas Eve on 24 December ====
The fifth of the people made a big bonfire in the town square where everyone gathers family.

Another local tradition is the Thursday's friend, a picnic where families gather to spend the day under the oak trees. This tradition was lost in 1960 following the construction in the vicinity of the shrine dedicated to the patron saints San Justo and San Pastor, in the El Cuadrado "The Ghost with the consent of the owners to perform there one day year's pilgrimage.

In the Thursday Compadre families in cars or walking their way to nearby fields where they worked Cordobilla neighbors. They spent the day between cork and holm oak family meeting. At dusk each group returned to the people of the different areas where they had spent the day jacket to meet all the neighbors in the village and continue the festivities.

The typical wedding is still celebrated with chocolate, meeting days before the wedding in which the families of the couple, aided by close family and inviting traditional chocolate and sweets made by hand. It was formerly danced Dagger, Jack's own area reserved for weddings in honor of the new marriage. While dancing the jota in front of the newlyweds, guests pass leaving gifts.

After the wedding celebration, homemade sweets, such as bores, threads of the lamp, etc. surplus is shared with family and guests, which will be presented with these delicacies.

Carnival has a long tradition in Cordobilla of Lácara, with parades and masks. There are carnival parade where the parade troupes and smaller groups. Within this pre-Lenten festival is celebrated on Shrove Tuesday which was popularly known as "day of water." This day the boys walk loaded with buckets of water in search of girls to that afloat. Neighbors make a water fight in every street of the village.

==== Oil Production ====
Parent. Coop. Field Ltd. is located in the city, founded in 1984. A small group of growers in the town bought an old mill and become Cooperative Society Limited in Campo. Eventually, all local oil producers were integrated in the Cooperative "The Lácara." Today its membership is around 300.

All members are required to keep their production of olives to the mill of the cooperative and assign a proportion of their production to the cooperative for funding, maintenance and modernization. This contribution, in proportion to each partner in terms of what it produces and not fixed, is the Capital of the cooperative. Suguna contributed by each social capital than they have in society is different for each partner what he has made during his years as a member of the cooperative. The Social Capital is what has allowed the modernization of the means of transformation of the olive oil. Currently the conversion is done by means of modern amenities.

During the year 1997, begins the great conversion of the olive groves of Lácara Cordobilla, all integrated in the Cooperative The Lácara, beginning its transformation into ECOLOGICAL OLIVARES, olive groves which can not be cast for its treatment any product not authorized by CEPA (Comité Extremeño Ecological Agricultural Production). In this way the oil was reorganized into oil from organic farming, since being registered and endorsed by the CRAEX (Agro Ecological Control Board Extremadura) under number 0011 / E. It is the largest homogeneous area of Extremadura organic oil production.

VERDIAL olive variety is the most widespread in the area, which gives its name to VERDIAL Lácara oil. This variety is very resistant to drought and high humidity do not need to mature, which runs from mid November to late December, so it is perfectly adapted to the terrain and continental climate of the province of Badajoz. Fruits are long and highly variable oil content but high in the zone of Lácara Cordobilla reaching 22%. The ning her meat-bone is also high, which makes the olives may be used for table consumption or for processing alamazara oil. The oils from the olive variety Verdial are sweet and fruity, and the fact that they are organic production and flight (never land with olives) make Verdial Lácara oil does not exceed 0.2 degrees of acidity, with and Extra Virgin.

Oil production is one of the major sectors in the economy of the town due to the large expanse of olive groves in the south of the municipality. Currently 100% of oil production is from farming and are distinguished only two types: Olive Oil Organic Extra Virgin Olive Oil and Green.

The olive harvest traditionally begins in mid December, at which time the mill opens its doors to the back of the product and begins to run conversion using modern oil-based media in a continuous system of two phases. Gone are the old ways of grinding rollers and hydraulic presses that started with the small group of founders of the Cooperativa del Campo "The Lácara" mid 1980s to buy an old mill obsolete. In mid-January, according to the volume of harvest, are beginning to become the first ecological liters of oil. Depending on the year, the mill usually collect one million pounds of olives in a normal harvest, reaching and surpassing the two million kilograms in bumper crops, such as the recent of the years 2009 and 2010.

The cooperative Lácara Extremadura and organic production to ensure strict adherence to production and harvesting of olives. The daily recogidia is placed in the mill at the same time, distinguishing the ground and the flight to ensure quality and achieve the minimum of acidity in the finished product.

Olive Oil Organic Extra Virgin "Verdiial Lácara" is considered one of the world's best in their field and therefore guarantee it received international awards in recent years:

- First Prize for Extra Virgin Olive Oil from organic cultivation of Extremadura, the endpoint 2002.

- Third Prize at the First National Extra Virgin Olive Oil from organic cultivation of the Seventh Exhibition of Ecological Agriculture, held in Córdoba in 2002.

- Winner of the best organic oils in the world BIOFACH 2010, most important fair in the sector of organic products in Europe and one of the most important in the world that is held annually in the German city of Nuremberg. This has meant that the trading market has gone from a national to an international stage, one of France's major markets and prompted this change also by the growing interest in natural and organic products throughout the world.

== See also ==
- List of municipalities in Badajoz
