= List of municipalities in Badajoz =

Map of Spain with the province of Badajoz highlighted

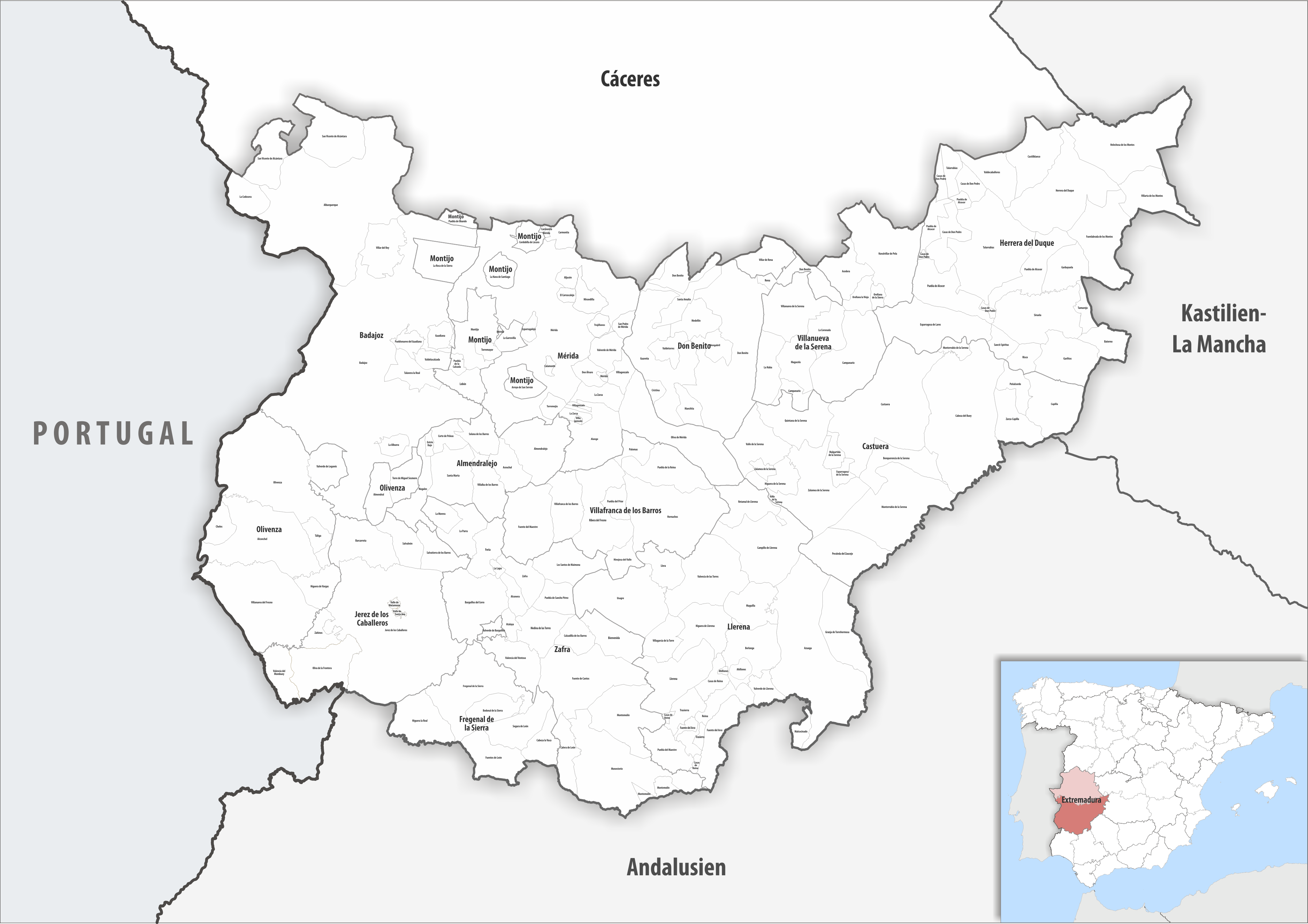
Map of the municipalities in the province of Badajoz

This is a list of the municipalities in the province of Badajoz, in the autonomous community of Extremadura, Spain.

== List ==
Name	Population (2025)
Acedera	815
Aceuchal	5,307
Ahillones	793
Alange	1,802
La Albuera	1,995
Alburquerque	4,928
Alconchel	1,592
Alconera	748
Aljucén	252
Almendral	1,404
Almendralejo	34,587
Arroyo de San Serván	4,001
Atalaya	258
Azuaga	7,587
Badajoz	150,209
Barcarrota	3,371
Baterno	231
Benquerencia de la Serena	771
Berlanga	2,171
Bienvenida	1,999
Bodonal de la Sierra	982
Burguillos del Cerro	1,257
Cabeza del Buey	4,489
Cabeza la Vaca	1,257
Calamonte	6,104
Calera de León	912
Calzadilla de los Barros	679
Campanario	4,702
Campillo de Llerena	1,373
Capilla	212
Carmonita	639
El Carrascalejo	75
Casas de Don Pedro	1,737
Casas de Reina	228
Castilblanco	1,293
Castuera	5,457
La Codosera	1,983
Cordobilla de Lácara	1,026
La Coronada	2,409
Corte de Peleas	1,297
Cristina	548
Cheles	1,332
Don Álvaro	668
Don Benito	32,023
Entrín Bajo	639
Esparragalejo	1,532
Esparragosa de la Serena	1,129
Esparragosa de Lares	1,107
Feria	1,435
Fregenal de la Sierra	5,295
Fuenlabrada de los Montes	2,046
Fuente de Cantos	4,583
Fuente del Arco	648
Fuente del Maestre	6,499
Fuentes de León	2,118
Garbayuela	450
Garlitos	510
La Garrovilla	2,310
Granja de Torrehermosa	1,913
Guadiana	2,444
Guareña	6,665
La Haba	1,184
Helechosa de los Montes	556
Herrera del Duque	3,385
Higuera de la Serena	881
Higuera de Llerena	422
Higuera de Vargas	1,830
Higuera la Real	2,186
Hinojosa del Valle	489
Hornachos	3,375
Jerez de los Caballeros	9,095
La Lapa	298
Lobón	2,756
Llera	781
Llerena	5,642
Magacela	502
Maguilla	919
Malcocinado	343
Malpartida de la Serena	508
Manchita	741
Medellín	2,241
Medina de las Torres	1,160
Mengabril	504
Mérida	60,225
Mirandilla	1,232
Monesterio	4,245
Montemolín	1,231
Monterrubio de la Serena	2,157
Montijo	15,198
La Morera	698
La Nava de Santiago	914
Navalvillar de Pela	4,303
Nogales	632
Oliva de la Frontera	4,907
Oliva de Mérida	1,963
Olivenza	11,789
Orellana de la Sierra	250
Orellana la Vieja	2,580
Palomas	726
La Parra	1,297
Peñalsordo	805
Peraleda del Zaucejo	465
Puebla de Alcocer	1,414
Puebla de la Calzada	5,815
Puebla de la Reina	907
Puebla de Obando	2,045
Puebla de Sancho Pérez	2,634
Puebla del Maestre	906
Puebla del Prior	462
Pueblonuevo del Guadiana	1,955
Quintana de la Serena	4,429
Reina	144
Rena	605
Retamal de Llerena	428
Ribera del Fresno	3,130
Risco	126
La Roca de la Sierra	1,454
Salvaleón	1,645
Salvatierra de los Barros	1,546
San Pedro de Mérida	859
San Vicente de Alcántara	5,227
Sancti-Spíritus	141
Santa Amalia	3,881
Santa Marta	4,201
Los Santos de Maimona	8,088
Segura de León	1,758
Siruela	1,766
Solana de los Barros	2,522
Talarrubias	3,251
Talavera la Real	5,288
Táliga	650
Tamurejo	276
Torre de Miguel Sesmero	1,234
Torremayor	1,044
Torremejía	2,091
Trasierra	718
Trujillanos	1,379
Usagre	1,698
Valdecaballeros	1,036
Valdelacalzada	2,743
Valdetorres	1,105
Valencia de las Torres	486
Valencia del Mombuey	703
Valencia del Ventoso	1,870
Valverde de Burguillos	260
Valverde de Leganés	4,230
Valverde de Llerena	560
Valverde de Mérida	1,002
Valle de la Serena	1,075
Valle de Matamoros	337
Valle de Santa Ana	1,090
Villafranca de los Barros	12,284
Villagarcía de la Torre	909
Villagonzalo	1,226
Villalba de los Barros	1,429
Villanueva de la Serena	25,773
Villanueva del Fresno	3,247
Villar de Rena	1,326
Villar del Rey	2,064
Villarta de los Montes	375
Zafra	16,735
Zahínos	2,766
Zalamea de la Serena	3,371
La Zarza	3,339
Zarza-Capilla	295

== See also ==
- Geography of Spain
- List of Spanish cities
