= Valverde de Burguillos =

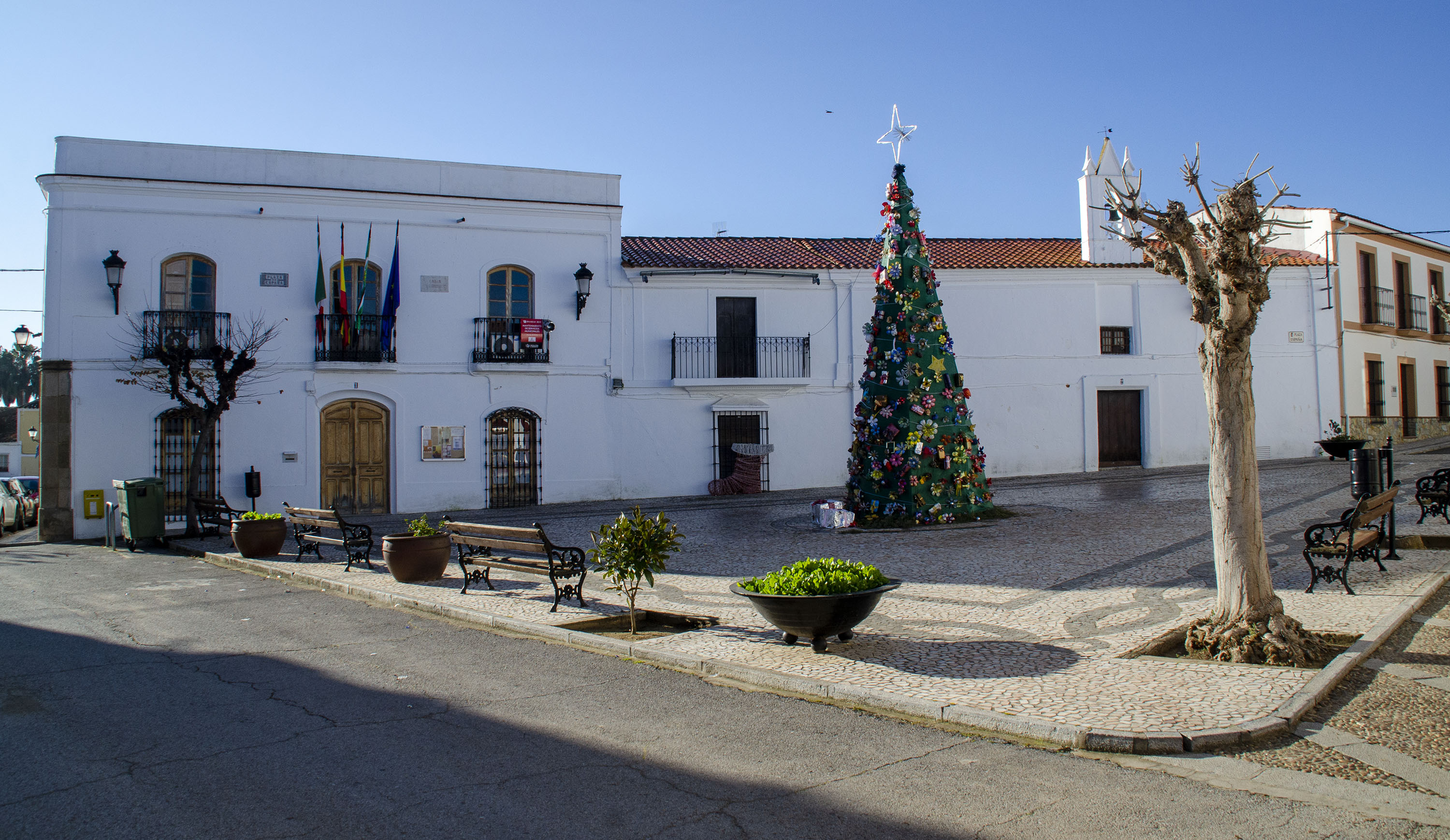
- Town hall

- Coat of arms

- Location in Spain.
- Coordinates: 38°19′38″N 6°32′10″W
- Country: Spain
- Autonomous community: Extremadura
- Province: Badajoz
- Comarca: Zafra - Río Bodión

Government
  - Mayor: Francisco Domínguez Jara

Area
  - Total: 19 km^{2} (7.3 sq mi)
- Elevation: 409 m (1,342 ft)

Population (2025-01-01)
  - Total: 260
  - Density: 14/km^{2} (35/sq mi)
- Demonym(s): Valverdeños, Valverdejos
- Time zone: UTC+1 (CET)
  - Summer (DST): UTC+2 (CEST)
- Website: Official website

Valverde de Burguillos is a municipality located in the province of Badajoz, Extremadura, Spain. According to the 2005 census (INE), the municipality has a population of 326 inhabitants.

== See also ==
- List of municipalities in Badajoz
