= Fuentes de León =

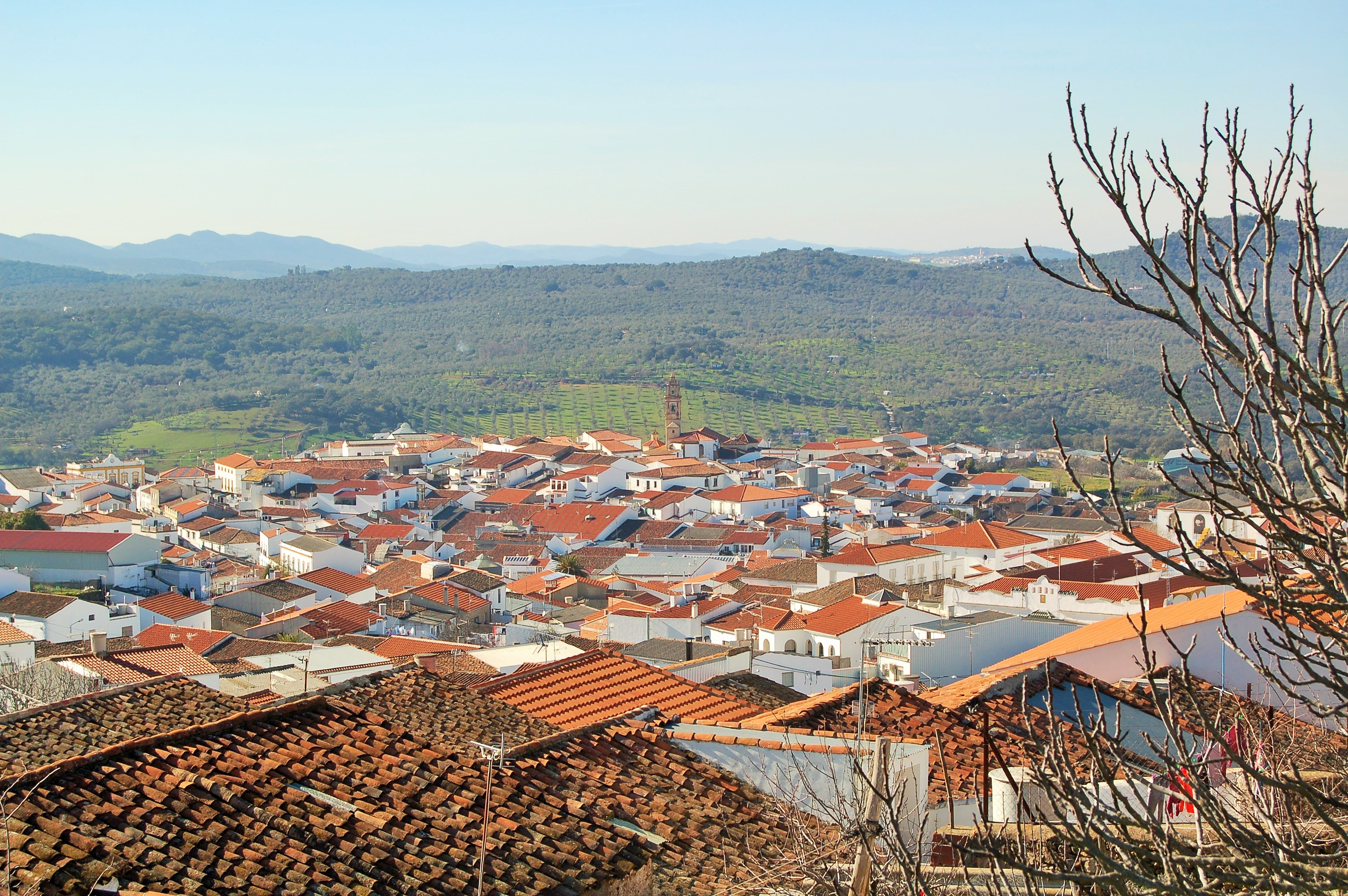

- Coat of arms

- Location of Fuentes de León within Extremadura
- Coordinates: 38°4′7″N 6°32′19″W
- Country: Spain
- Autonomous community: Extremadura
- Province: Badajoz
- Municipality: Fuentes de León

Area
  - Total: 110 km^{2} (42 sq mi)
- Elevation: 741 m (2,431 ft)

Population (2025-01-01)
  - Total: 2,118
  - Density: 19/km^{2} (50/sq mi)
- Time zone: UTC+1 (CET)
  - Summer (DST): UTC+2 (CEST)
- Website: www.fuentesdeleon.com

Fuentes de León (Extremaduran: Fuentis de Lión) is a municipality located in the province of Badajoz, Extremadura, Spain. According to the 2005 census (INE), the municipality has a population of 2674 inhabitants.

== See also ==
- List of municipalities in Badajoz
