= El Carrascalejo =

- Municipality
- Coat of arms

- Location of El Carrascalejo within Extremadura
- Coordinates: 39°1′22″N 6°20′14″W
- Country: Spain
- Autonomous community: Extremadura
- Province: Badajoz
- Municipality: El Carrascalejo

Area
  - Total: 13 km^{2} (5.0 sq mi)
- Elevation: 308 m (1,010 ft)

Population (2025-01-01)
  - Total: 80
  - Density: 6.2/km^{2} (16/sq mi)
- Time zone: UTC+1 (CET)
  - Summer (DST): UTC+2 (CEST)

El Carrascalejo is a municipality located in the province of Badajoz, Extremadura, Spain. According to the 2014 census, the municipality has a population of 68 inhabitants.
