= Villagonzalo =

Coordinates: 38°52′N 6°12′W

- municipality
- Coat of arms
- Interactive map of Villagonzalo
- Country: Spain
- Autonomous community: Extremadura
- Province: Badajoz
- Municipality: Villagonzalo

Area
  - Total: 41 km^{2} (16 sq mi)
- Elevation: 237 m (778 ft)

Population (2025-01-01)
  - Total: 1,226
  - Density: 30/km^{2} (77/sq mi)
- Time zone: UTC+1 (CET)
  - Summer (DST): UTC+2 (CEST)

Villagonzalo is a municipality located in the province of Badajoz, Extremadura, Spain. According to the 2005 census (INE), the municipality has a population of 1336 inhabitants.

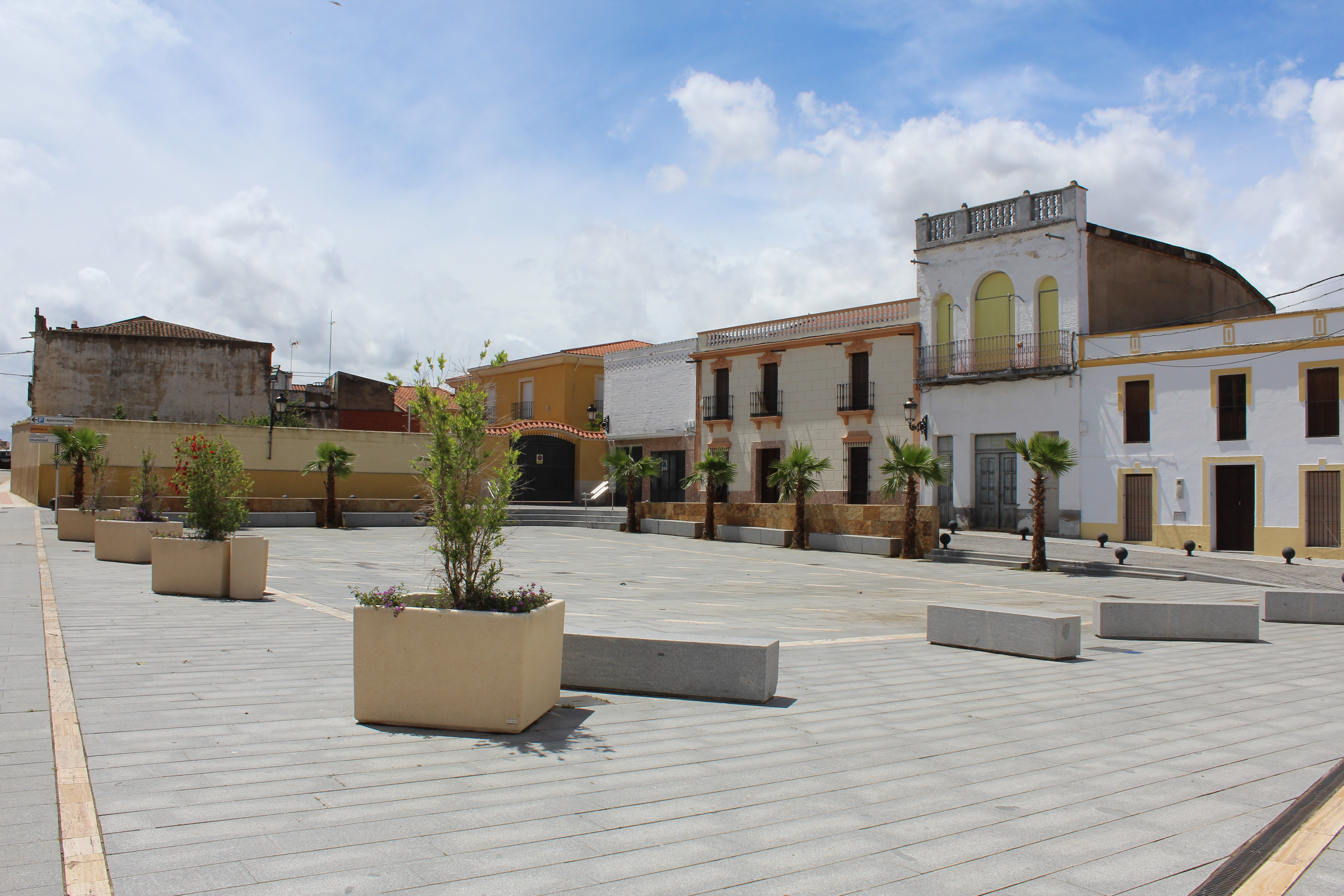
Main Square of Villagonzalo

== See also ==
- List of municipalities in Badajoz
