= Aljucén =

- municipality
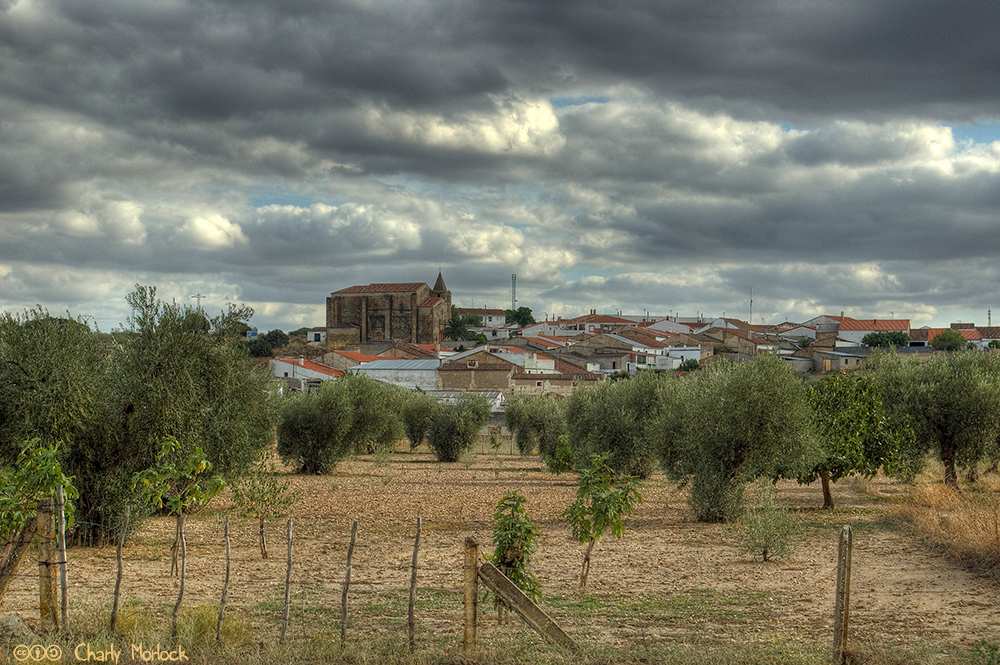

- Coat of arms

- Location of Aljucén within Extremadura
- Coordinates: 39°2′40″N 6°19′49″W
- Country: Spain
- Autonomous community: Extremadura
- Province: Badajoz
- Municipality: Aljucén

Area
  - Total: 19 km^{2} (7.3 sq mi)
- Elevation: 270 m (890 ft)

Population (2025-01-01)
  - Total: 252
  - Density: 13/km^{2} (34/sq mi)
- Time zone: UTC+1 (CET)
  - Summer (DST): UTC+2 (CEST)

Aljucén (Spanish pronunciation: [alxuˈθen]) is a municipality located in the province of Badajoz, Extremadura, Spain. According to the 2006 census (INE), the municipality has a population of 247 inhabitants.

== See also ==
- List of municipalities in Badajoz
