= Palomas, Badajoz =

Palomas
- town
- Coat of arms

- Location within Spain
- Coordinates: 38°41′0″N 6°8′24″W
- Country: Spain
- Autonomous community: Extremadura
- Province: Badajoz
- Comarca: Tierra de Barros

Government
  - Alcalde: Francisco Ginés Vázquez

Area
  - Total: 40.5 km^{2} (15.6 sq mi)
- Elevation: 326 m (1,070 ft)

Population (2025-01-01)
  - Total: 651
- Time zone: UTC+1 (CET)
  - Summer (DST): UTC+2 (CEST)
- Website: Ayuntamiento de Palomas

Palomas is a Spanish town in the province of Badajoz, Extremadura. It has a population of 703 (2007) and an area of 40.5 km^{2}.

== Buildings ==
- Nuestra Señora de Gracia Parish Church

== See also ==
- List of municipalities in Badajoz
