= Alconera =

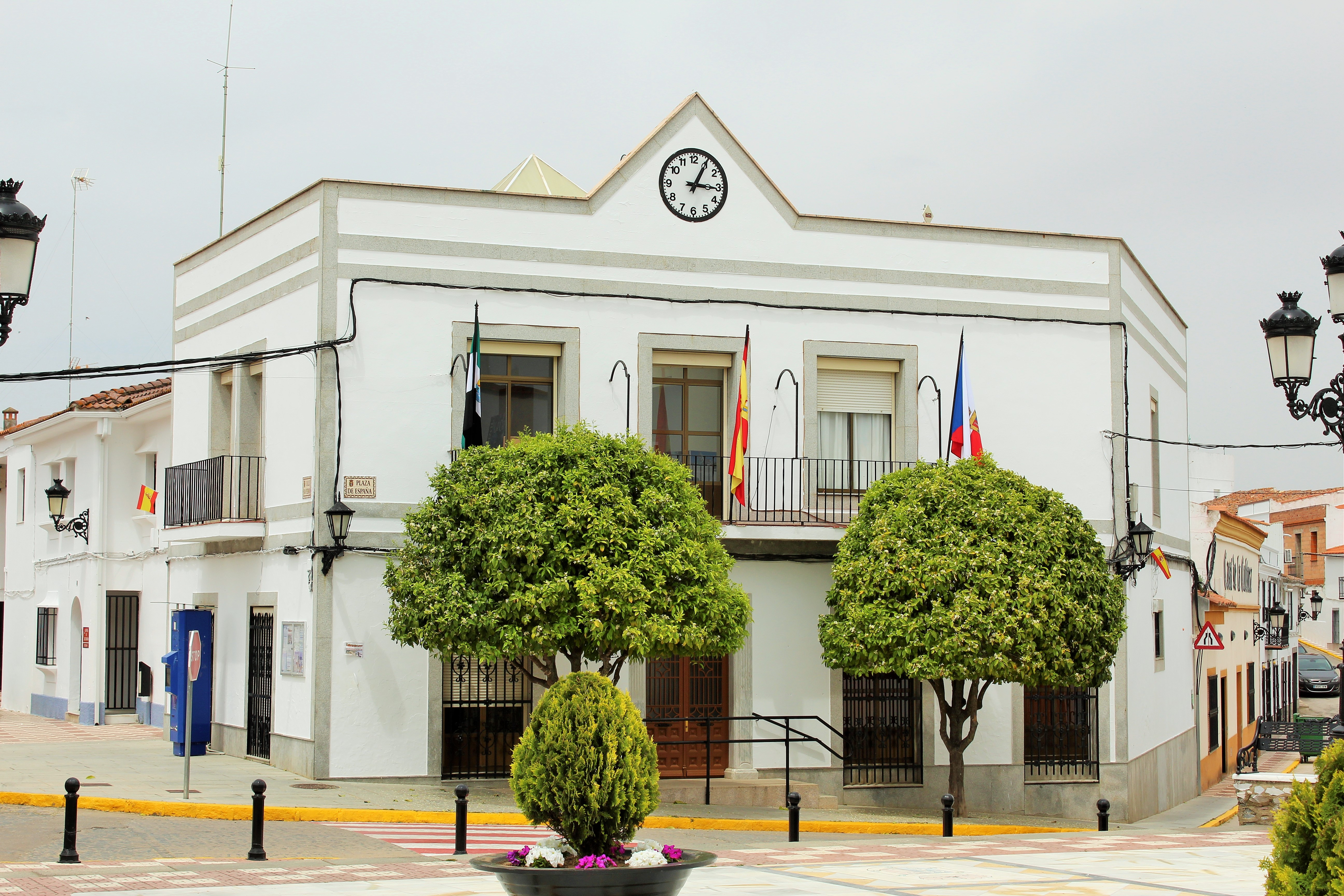
- Town hall

- Flag Coat of arms

- Location of Alconera within Extremadura
- Coordinates: 38°23′50″N 6°28′36″W
- Country: Spain
- Autonomous community: Extremadura
- Province: Badajoz
- Comarca: Zafra - Río Bodión

Government
  - Alcalde: Manuel Galea Santos

Area
  - Total: 32.7 km^{2} (12.6 sq mi)
- Elevation: 516 m (1,693 ft)

Population (2025-01-01)
  - Total: 748
- Time zone: UTC+1 (CET)
  - Summer (DST): UTC+2 (CEST)
- Website: Ayuntamiento de Alconera

Alconera is a Spanish municipality in the province of Badajoz, Extremadura. It has a population of 735 (2007) and an area of 32.7 km^{2} (12.6 sq mi).

== See also ==
- List of municipalities in Badajoz
