= Navalvillar de Pela =

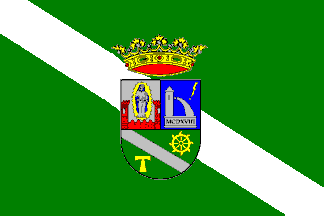
- Flag Coat of arms

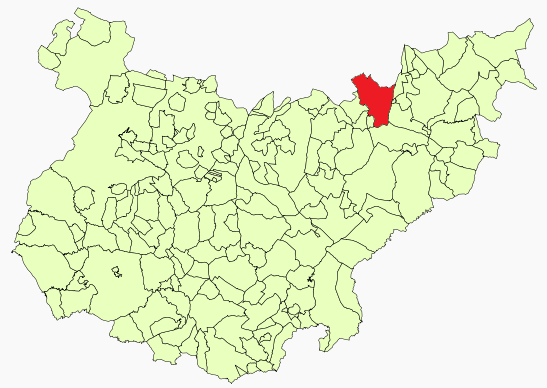
- Location in Badajoz

- Location of Navalvillar de Pela within Extremadura
- Coordinates: 39°5′00″N 5°28′00″W
- Country: Spain
- Autonomous community: Extremadura
- Province: Badajoz
- Comarca: Vegas Altas

Government
  - Alcalde: Francisco Javier Fernández Cano

Area
  - Total: 251.2 km^{2} (97.0 sq mi)
- Elevation: 368 m (1,207 ft)

Population (2025-01-01)
  - Total: 4,303
  - Density: 17.13/km^{2} (44.37/sq mi)
- Time zone: UTC+1 (CET)
  - Summer (DST): UTC+2 (CEST)
- Website: Ayuntamiento de Navalvillar de Pela

Navalvillar de Pela is a Spanish municipality in the province of Badajoz, Extremadura. It has a population of 4,816 (2007) and an area of 251.2 km^{2}.

== See also ==
- List of municipalities in Badajoz
