= La Lapa =

- municipality
- Coat of arms

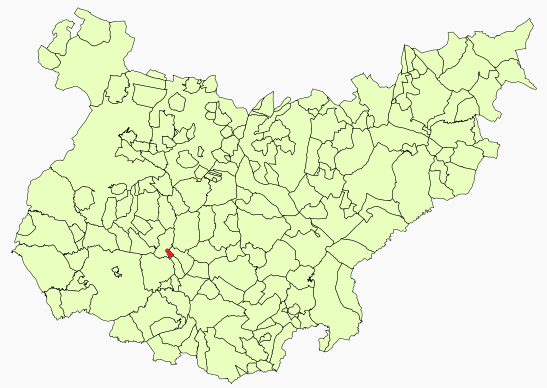
- Location in Badajoz

- Location of La Lapa within Extremadura
- Coordinates: 38°27′14″N 6°31′9″W
- Country: Spain
- Autonomous community: Extremadura
- Province: Badajoz

Government
  - Alcalde: Inocencio Rodríguez Muñoz (PSOE)

Area
  - Total: 8.1 km^{2} (3.1 sq mi)
- Elevation: 469 m (1,539 ft)

Population (2025-01-01)
  - Total: 298
  - Density: 37/km^{2} (95/sq mi)
- Time zone: UTC+1 (CET)
  - Summer (DST): UTC+2 (CEST)

La Lapa is a municipality located in the province of Badajoz, Extremadura, Spain. According to the 2006 census (INE), the municipality has a population of 314 inhabitants.

== See also ==
- List of municipalities in Badajoz
