= Mirandilla =

- municipality
- Coat of arms

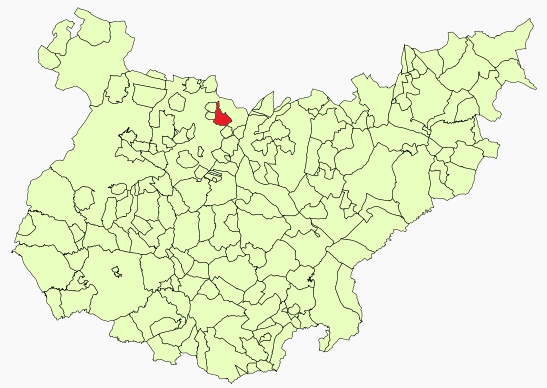
- Location in Badajoz

- Location of Mirandilla within Extremadura
- Coordinates: 39°00′6″N 6°17′15″W
- Country: Spain
- Autonomous community: Extremadura
- Province: Badajoz

Area
  - Total: 41.6 km^{2} (16.1 sq mi)
- Elevation: 298 m (978 ft)

Population (2025-01-01)
  - Total: 1,232
  - Density: 29.6/km^{2} (76.7/sq mi)
- Time zone: UTC+1 (CET)
  - Summer (DST): UTC+2 (CEST)

Mirandilla is a municipality located in Badajoz Province, Extremadura, Spain. According to the 2005 census (INE), the municipality has a population of 1358 inhabitants.

== See also ==
- List of municipalities in Badajoz
