= Puebla de Obando =

Coordinates: 39°11′N 6°38′W

- municipality
- Coat of arms

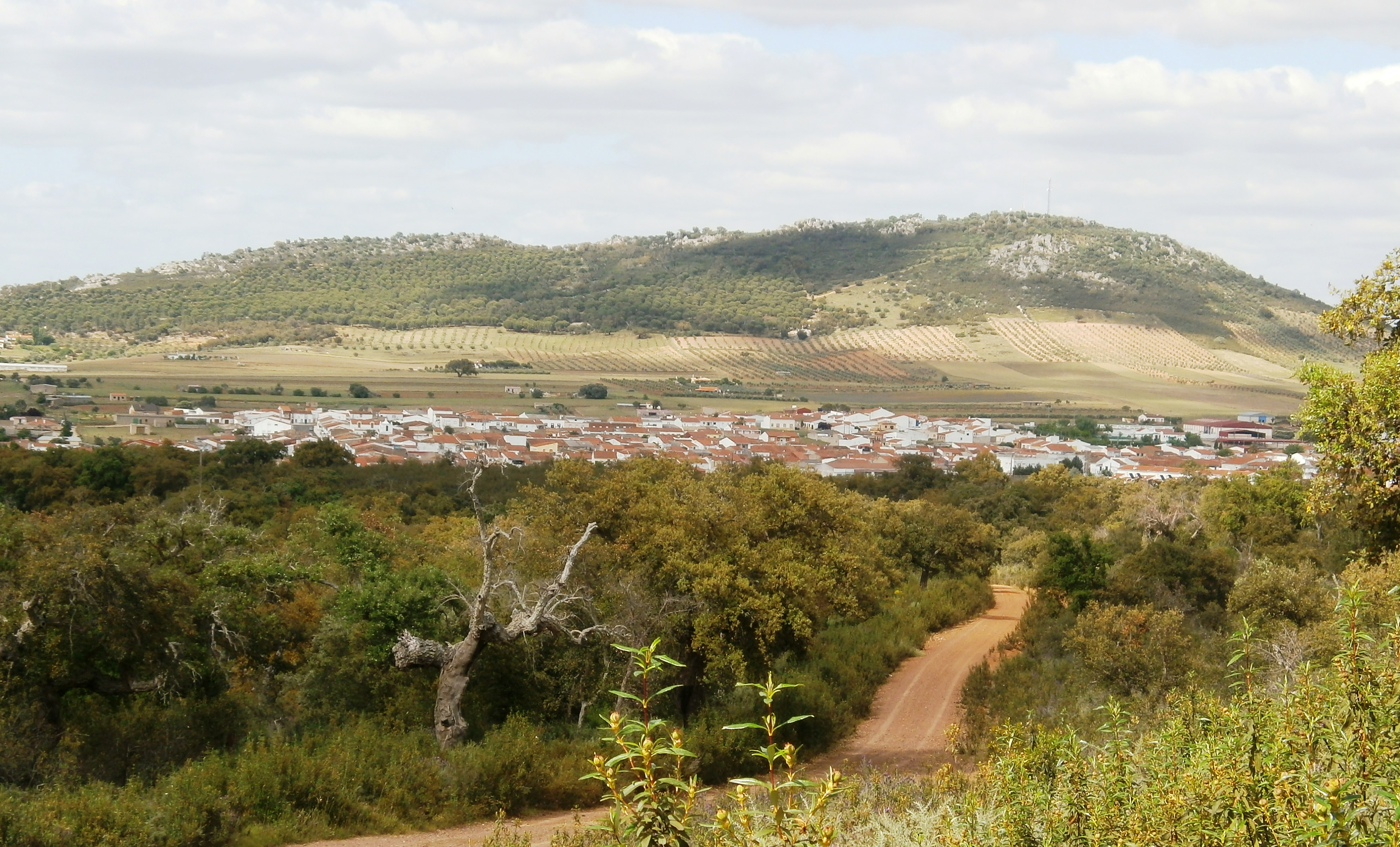
- Country: Spain
- Autonomous community: Extremadura
- Province: Badajoz

Area
  - Total: 24 km^{2} (9.3 sq mi)
- Elevation: 378 m (1,240 ft)

Population (2025-01-01)
  - Total: 1,809
  - Density: 75/km^{2} (200/sq mi)
- Time zone: UTC+1 (CET)
  - Summer (DST): UTC+2 (CEST)

Puebla de Obando is a municipality located in the province of Badajoz, Extremadura, Spain. According to the 2005 census (INE), the municipality has a population of 2033 inhabitants. It is the birthplace of former Real Madrid and now Deportivo Alavés goalkeeper, Fernando Pacheco Flores.

== See also ==
- List of municipalities in Badajoz
