= Esparragosa de la Serena =

Coordinates: 38°39′N 5°36′W

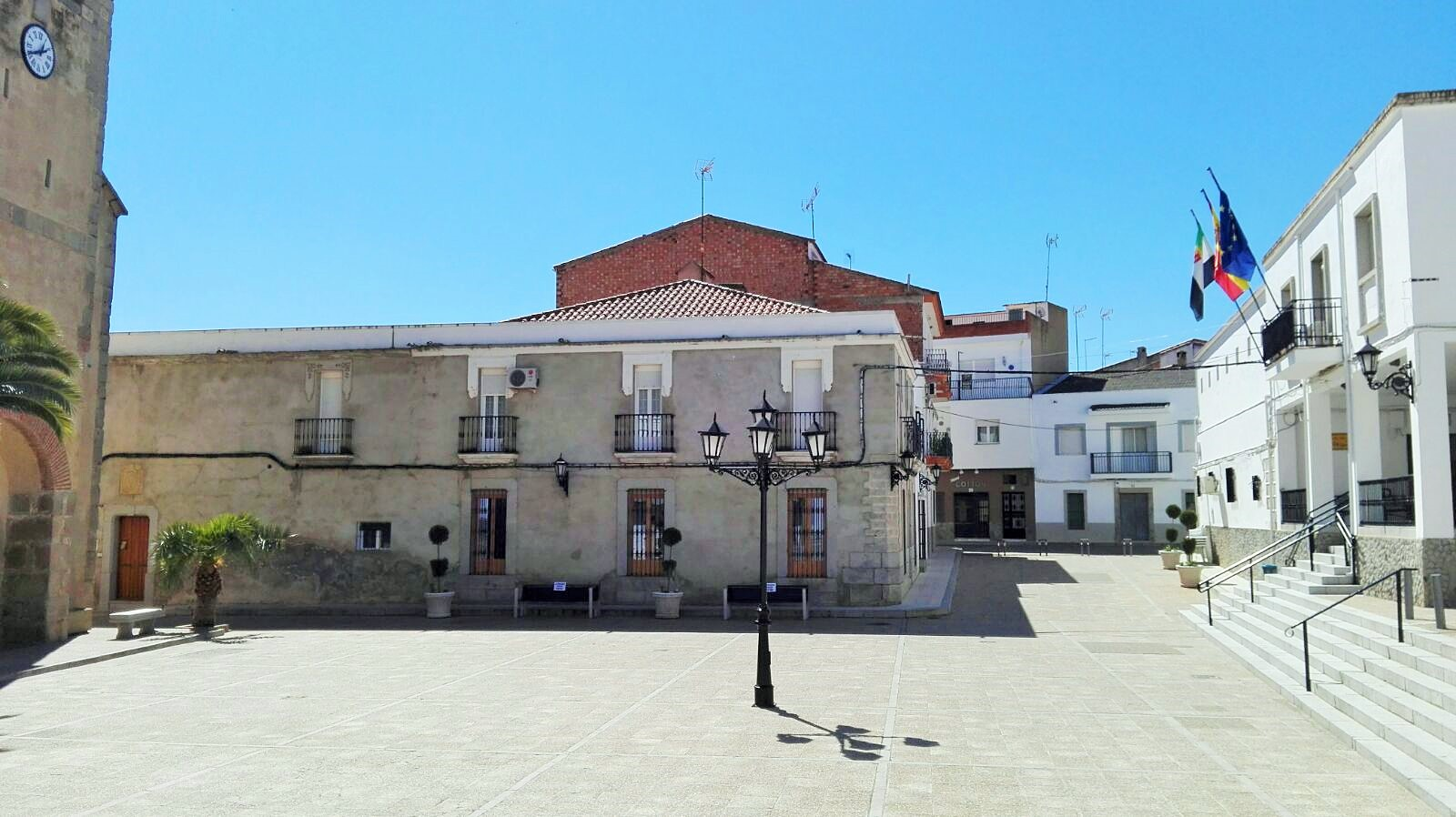
- Town hall

- Coat of arms

- Location in Spain.
- Country: Spain
- Autonomous community: Cáceres

Area
  - Total: 2.02 km^{2} (0.78 sq mi)
- Elevation: 446 m (1,463 ft)

Population (2025-01-01)
  - Total: 912
  - Density: 451/km^{2} (1,170/sq mi)
- Time zone: UTC+1 (CET)
  - Summer (DST): UTC+2 (CEST)
- Website: esparragosadelaserena.es

Esparragosa de la Serena is a municipality in the province of Badajoz, Extremadura, Spain. It has a population of 1,108 and an area of 21.66 km^{2} (8.36 sq mi).

== See also ==
- List of municipalities in Badajoz
