= Calzadilla de los Barros =

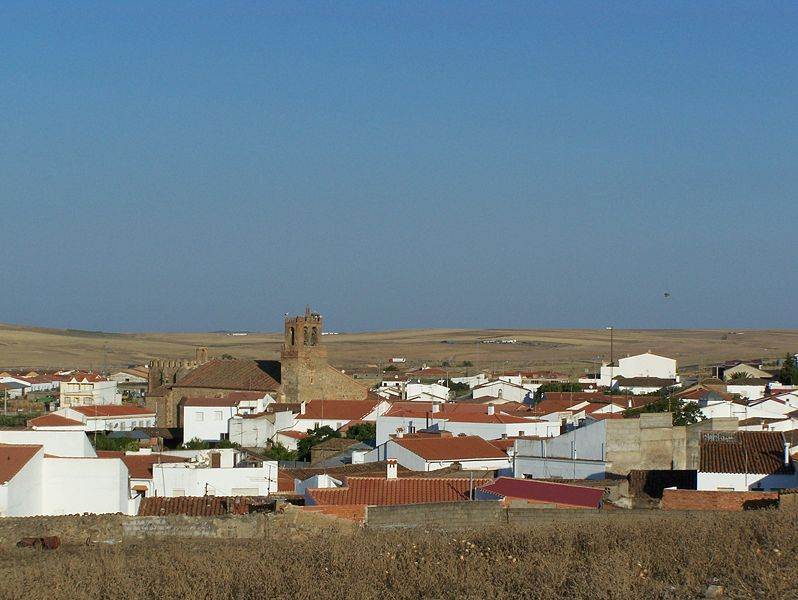

- Coat of arms

- Location of Calzadilla de los Barros within Extremadura
- Coordinates: 38°18′2″N 6°19′3″W
- Country: Spain
- Autonomous community: Extremadura
- Province: Badajoz
- Municipality: Calzadilla de los Barros

Area
  - Total: 52 km^{2} (20 sq mi)
- Elevation: 558 m (1,831 ft)

Population (2025-01-01)
  - Total: 679
  - Density: 13/km^{2} (34/sq mi)
- Time zone: UTC+1 (CET)
  - Summer (DST): UTC+2 (CEST)
- Website: http://www.calzadilladelosbarros.es

Calzadilla de los Barros is a municipality located in the province of Badajoz, Extremadura, Spain. According to the 2005 census (INE), the municipality has a population of 1174 inhabitants.

== See also ==
- List of municipalities in Badajoz
