= Torremayor =

Coordinates: 38°54′N 6°32′W

Torremayor, Spain
- municipality
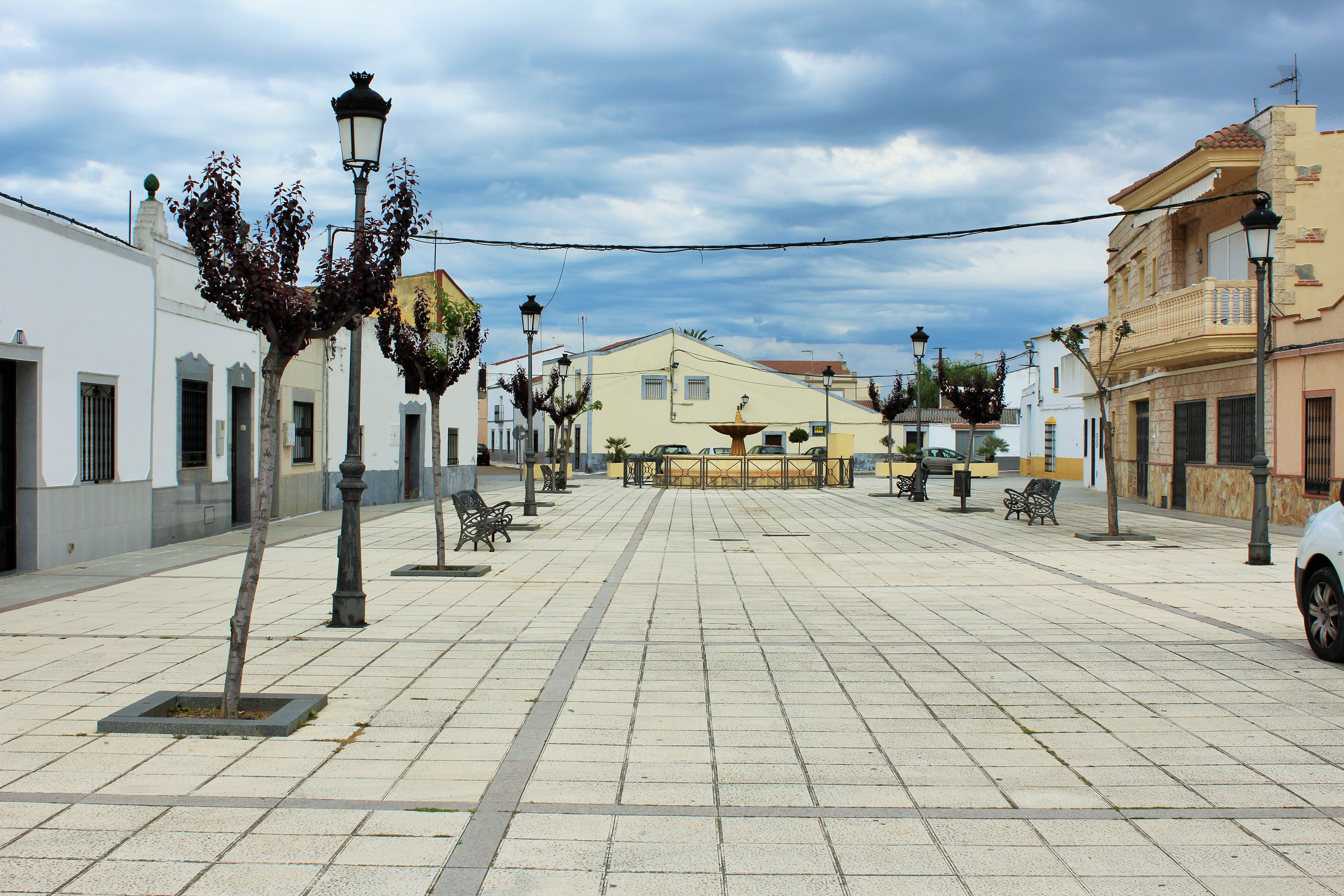
- View of Torremayor.

- Flag Coat of arms
- Interactive map of Torremayor, Spain
- Country: Spain
- Autonomous community: Extremadura
- Province: Badajoz
- Municipality: Torremayor

Area
  - Total: 21 km^{2} (8.1 sq mi)
- Elevation: 192 m (630 ft)

Population (2025-01-01)
  - Total: 992
  - Density: 47/km^{2} (120/sq mi)
- Time zone: UTC+1 (CET)
  - Summer (DST): UTC+2 (CEST)

Torremayor is a municipality located in the province of Badajoz, Extremadura, Spain. According to the 2005 census (INE), the municipality has a population of 1020 inhabitants.

== See also ==
- List of municipalities in Badajoz
