= Peñalsordo =

Coordinates: 38°49′N 5°07′W

Peñalsordo, Spain
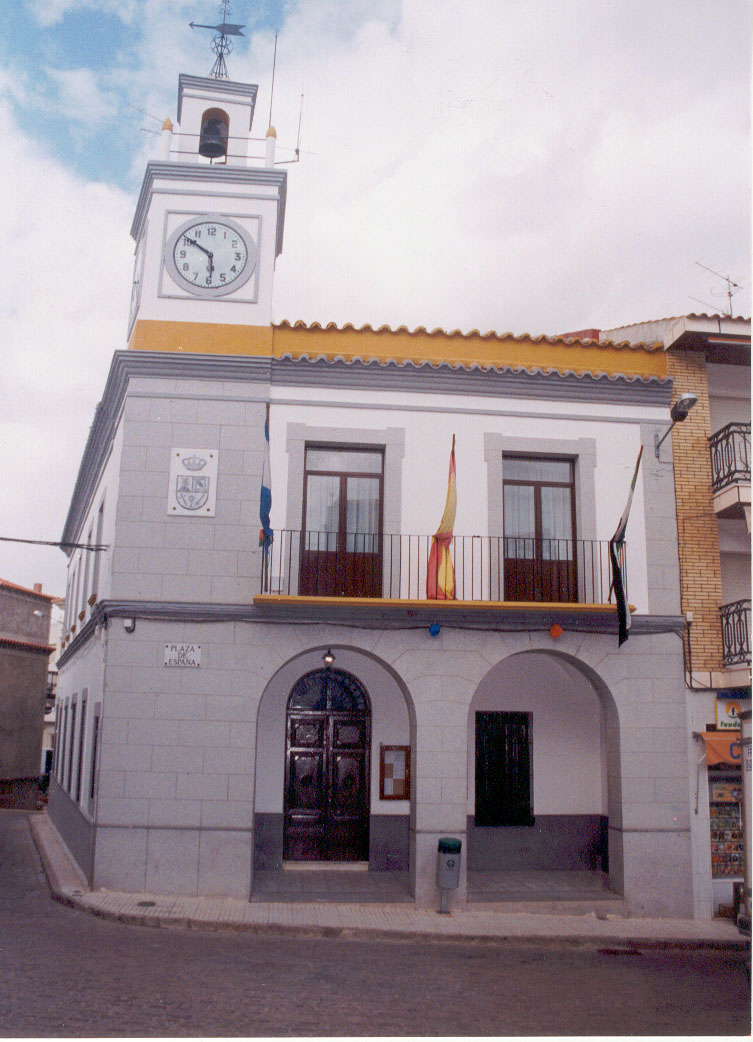
- Main facade of the Peñalsordo town hall, Badajoz.

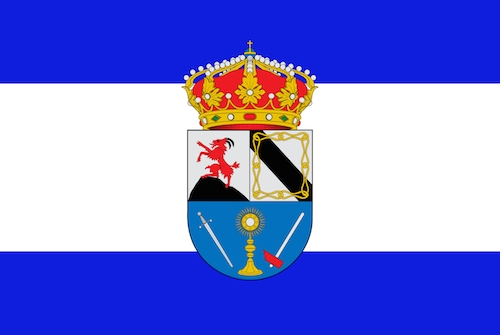
- Flag Coat of arms
- Interactive map of Peñalsordo, Spain
- Country: Spain
- Autonomous community: Extremadura
- Province: Badajoz
- Municipality: Peñalsordo

Area
  - Total: 47 km^{2} (18 sq mi)
- Elevation: 456 m (1,496 ft)

Population (2025-01-01)
  - Total: 805
  - Density: 17/km^{2} (44/sq mi)
- Time zone: UTC+1 (CET)
  - Summer (DST): UTC+2 (CEST)

Peñalsordo is a municipality located in the province of Badajoz, Extremadura, Spain. According to the 2010 census (INE), the municipality has a population of 1180 inhabitants.

== See also ==
- List of municipalities in Badajoz
