= San Pedro de Mérida =

Coordinates: 38°57′N 6°11′W

San Pedro de Mérida, Spain
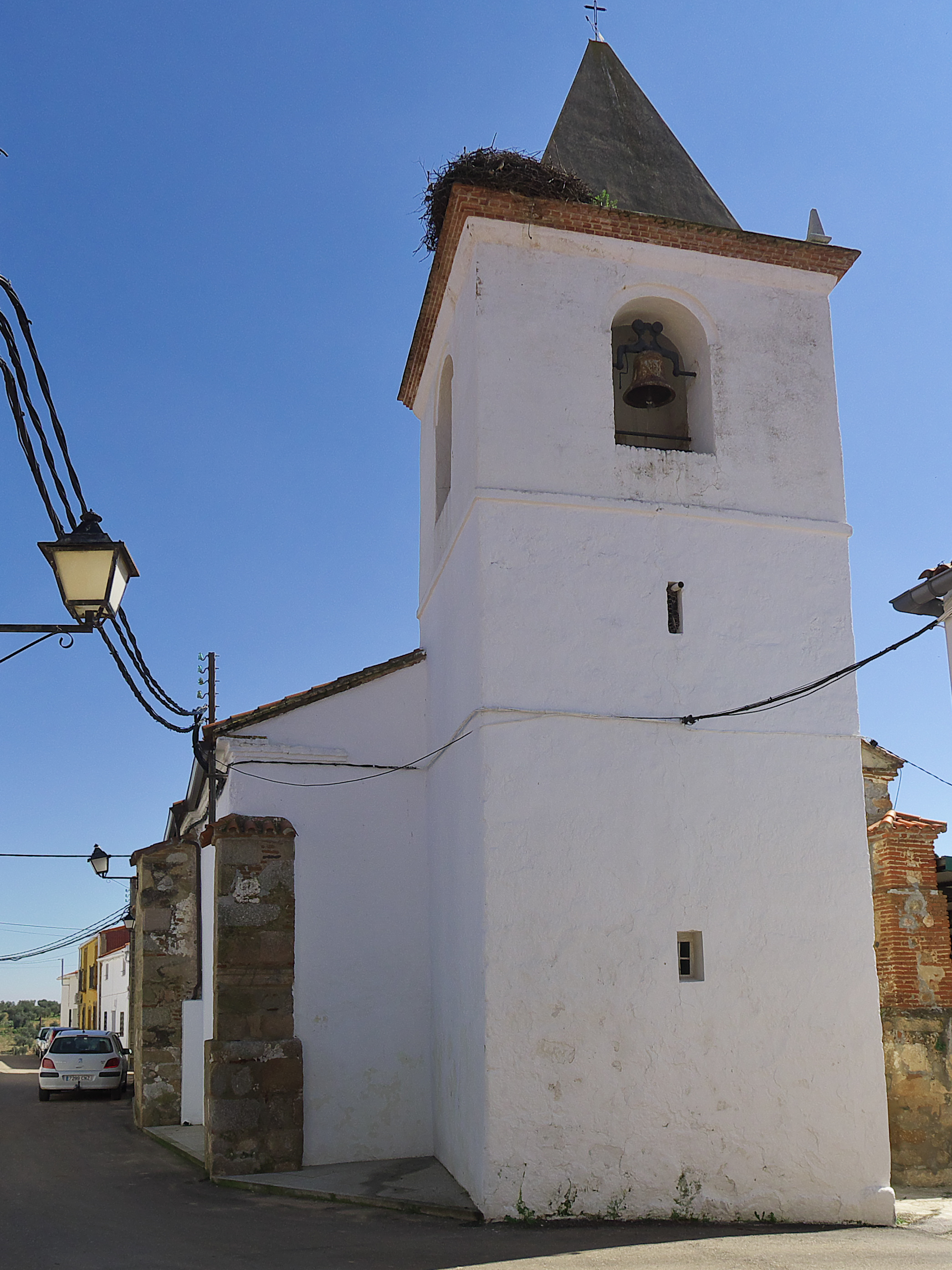
- Saint Peter the Apostle (Bell Tower) in San Pedro de Mérida

- Coat of arms
- Interactive map of San Pedro de Mérida, Spain
- Country: Spain
- Autonomous community: Extremadura
- Province: Badajoz
- Municipality: San Pedro de Mérida

Area
  - Total: 23 km^{2} (8.9 sq mi)
- Elevation: 282 m (925 ft)

Population (2025-01-01)
  - Total: 859
  - Density: 37/km^{2} (97/sq mi)
- Time zone: UTC+1 (CET)
  - Summer (DST): UTC+2 (CEST)

San Pedro de Mérida is a municipality located in the province of Badajoz, Extremadura, Spain. As of 2025, the municipality has a population of 859 inhabitants.

== See also ==
- List of municipalities in Badajoz
