= La Garrovilla =

- Municipality
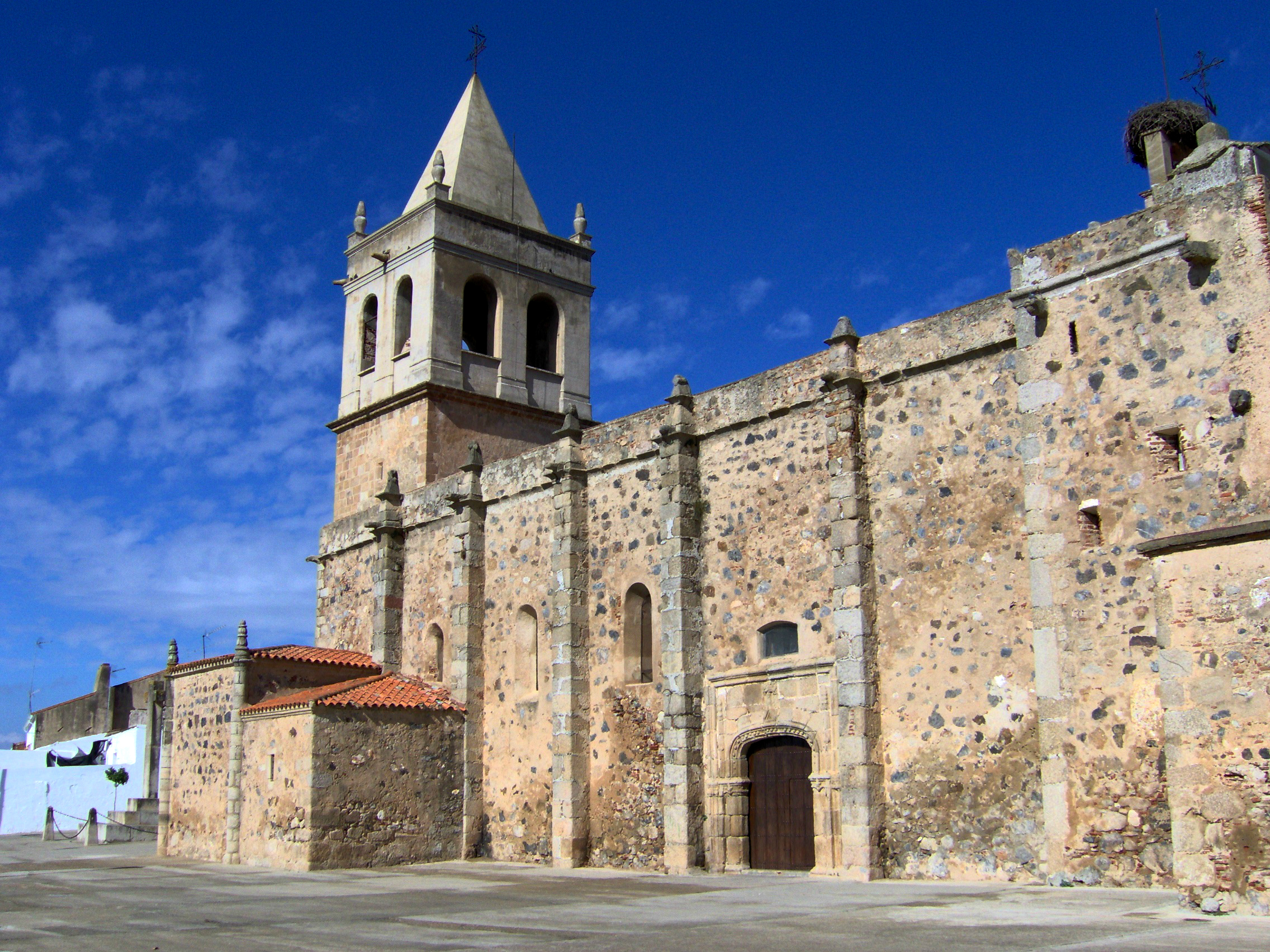
- Nuestra Señora de la Asunción Church

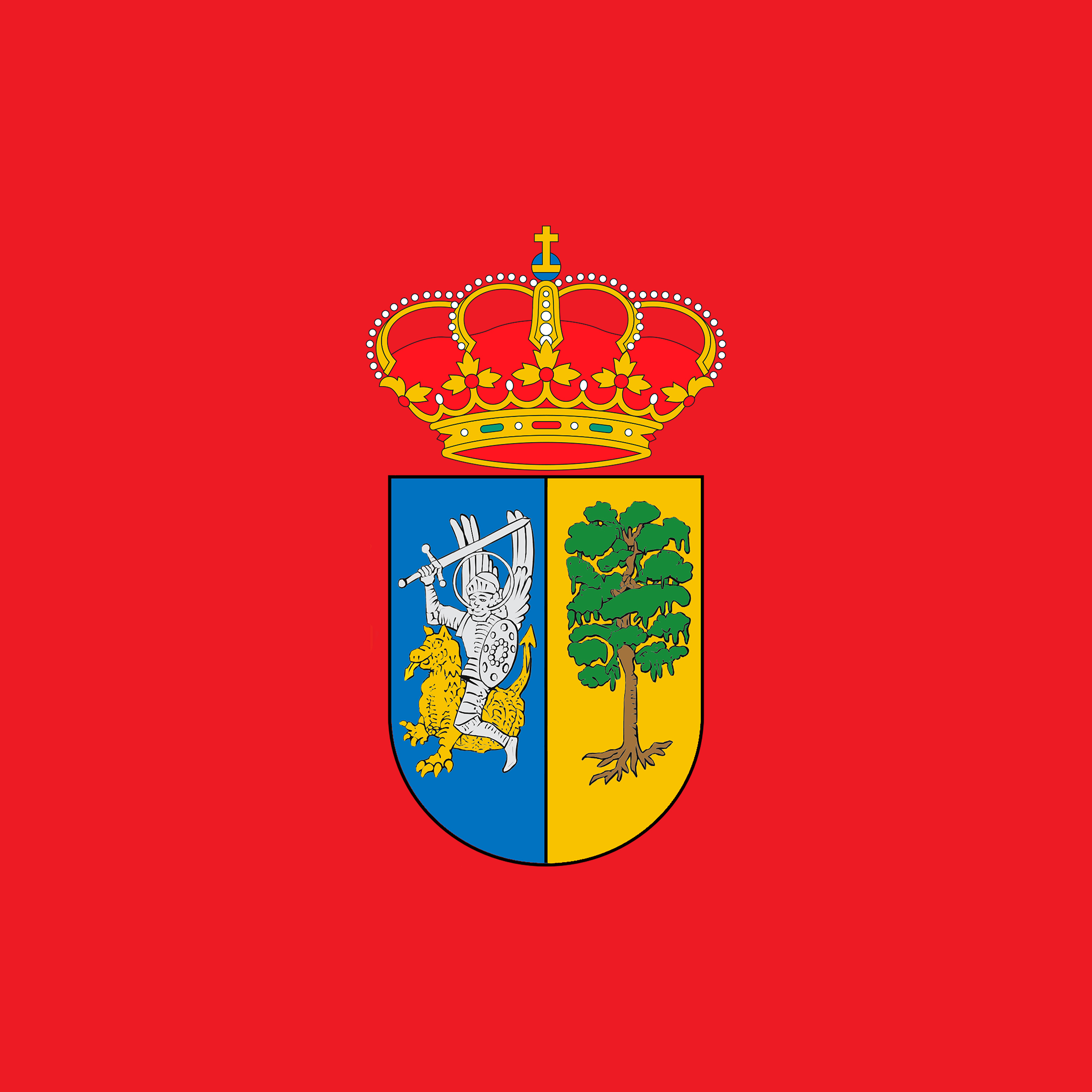
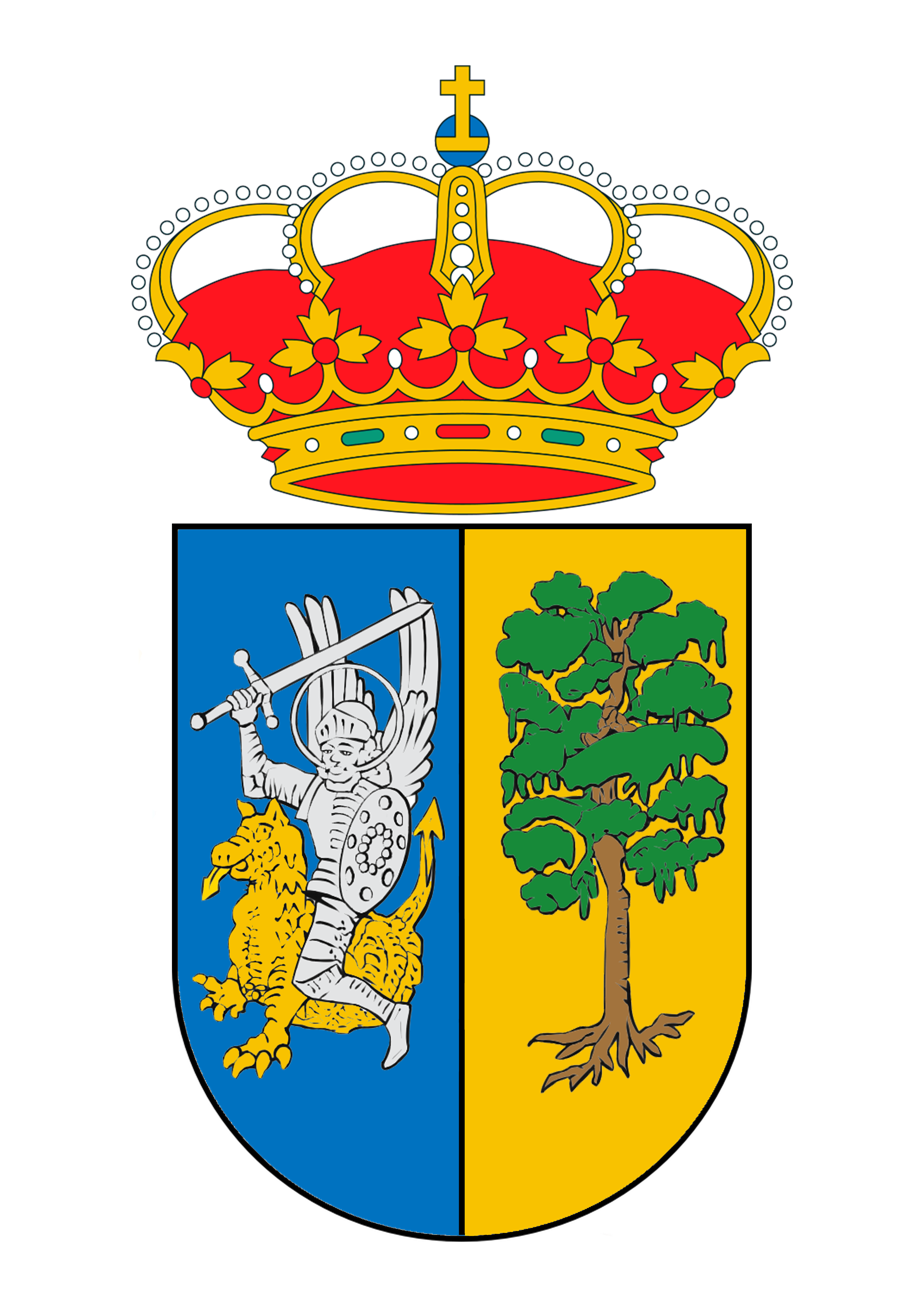
- Flag Coat of arms

- Location of La Garrovilla within Extremadura
- Coordinates: 38°55′16″N 6°28′33″W
- Country: Spain
- Autonomous Community: Extremadura
- Province: Badajoz
- Comarca: Tierra de Mérida – Vegas Bajas

Government
  - Mayor: Isabel Calle Jiménez (PP)

Area
  - Total: 33.5 km^{2} (12.9 sq mi)
- Elevation (AMSL): 215 m (705 ft)

Population (2025-01-01)
  - Total: 2,310
  - Density: 69.0/km^{2} (179/sq mi)
- Time zone: UTC+1 (CET)
  - Summer (DST): UTC+2 (CEST (GMT +2))
- Postal code: 06870
- Area code: +34 (Spain) + 924 (Badajoz)
- Website: www.dip-badajoz.es

La Garrovilla is a municipality located in the province of Badajoz, Extremadura, Spain. According to the 2010 census (INE), the municipality has a population of 2490 inhabitants.

== See also ==
- List of municipalities in Badajoz
