= Carmonita =

- town
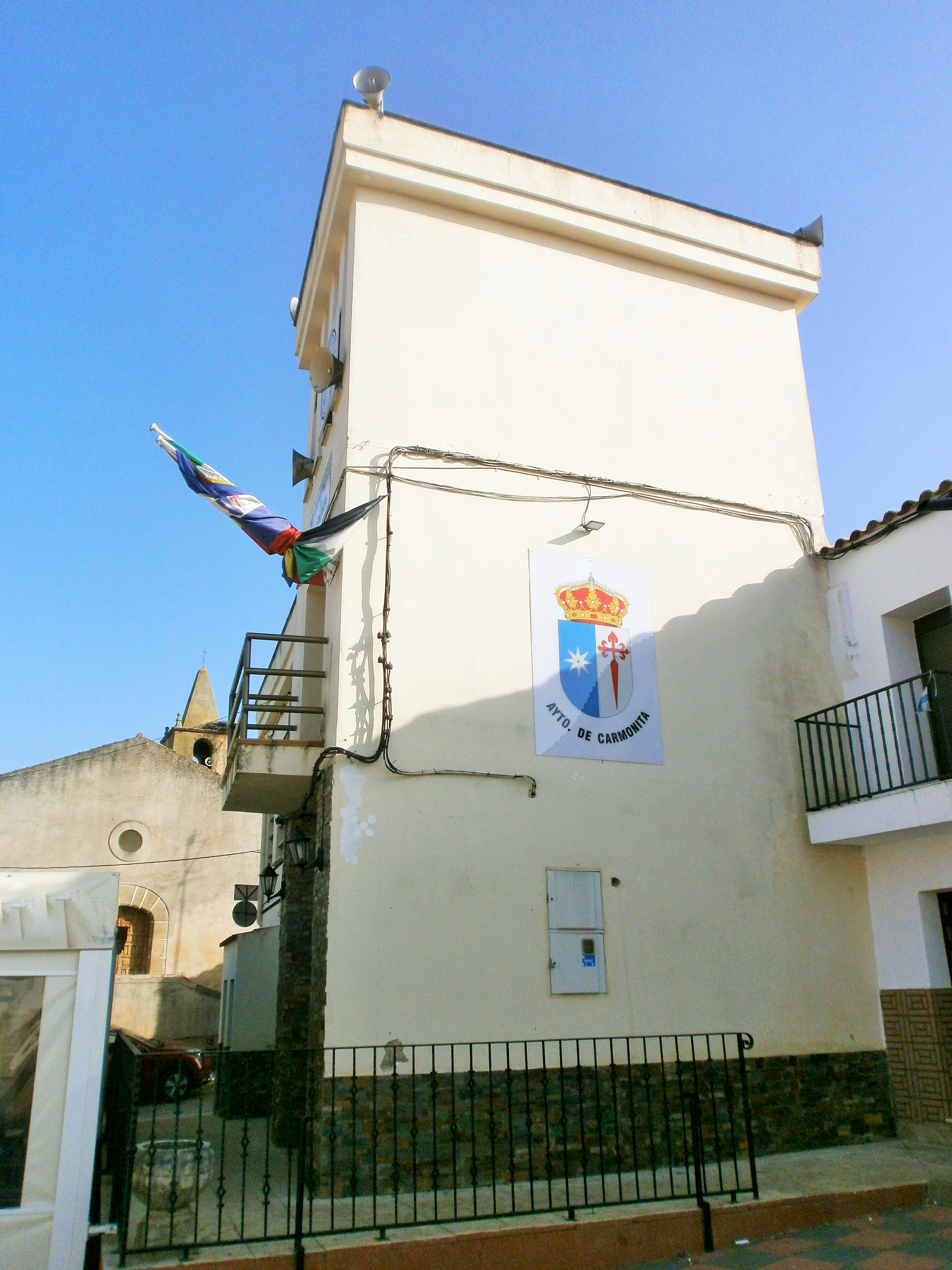
- Town hall

- Coat of arms

- Location of Carmonita within Extremadura
- Coordinates: 39°9′13″N 6°20′18″W
- Country: Spain
- Autonomous community: Extremadura
- Province: Badajoz
- Municipality: Carmonita

Area
  - Total: 38 km^{2} (15 sq mi)
- Elevation: 382 m (1,253 ft)

Population (2025-01-01)
  - Total: 514
  - Density: 14/km^{2} (35/sq mi)
- Time zone: UTC+1 (CET)
  - Summer (DST): UTC+2 (CEST)

Carmonita is a municipality located in the province of Badajoz, Extremadura, Spain. According to the 2006 census (INE), the municipality has a population of 650 inhabitants.

== See also ==
- List of municipalities in Badajoz
