= Hinojosa del Valle =

- municipality
- Coat of arms

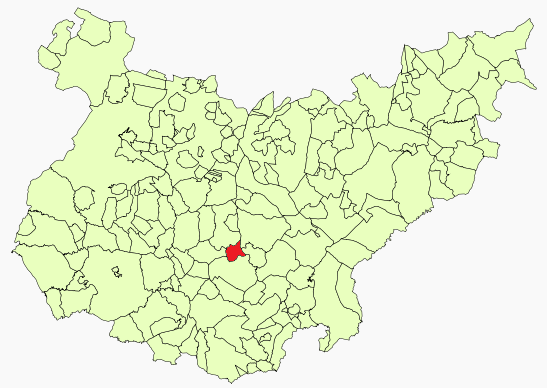
- Location in Badajoz

- Location of Hinojosa del Valle within Extremadura
- Coordinates: 38°29′1″N 6°11′5″W
- Country: Spain
- Autonomous community: Extremadura
- Province: Badajoz

Government
  - Mayor: Juan Durán López PSOE

Area
  - Total: 46 km^{2} (18 sq mi)
- Elevation: 442 m (1,450 ft)

Population (2025-01-01)
  - Total: 472
  - Density: 10/km^{2} (27/sq mi)
- Time zone: UTC+1 (CET)
  - Summer (DST): UTC+2 (CEST)

Hinojosa del Valle is a municipality in the province of Badajoz, Extremadura, Spain. It has a population of 557 and an area of 46 km^{2} (18 sq mi).

== See also ==
- List of municipalities in Badajoz
