= Mengabril =

- municipality
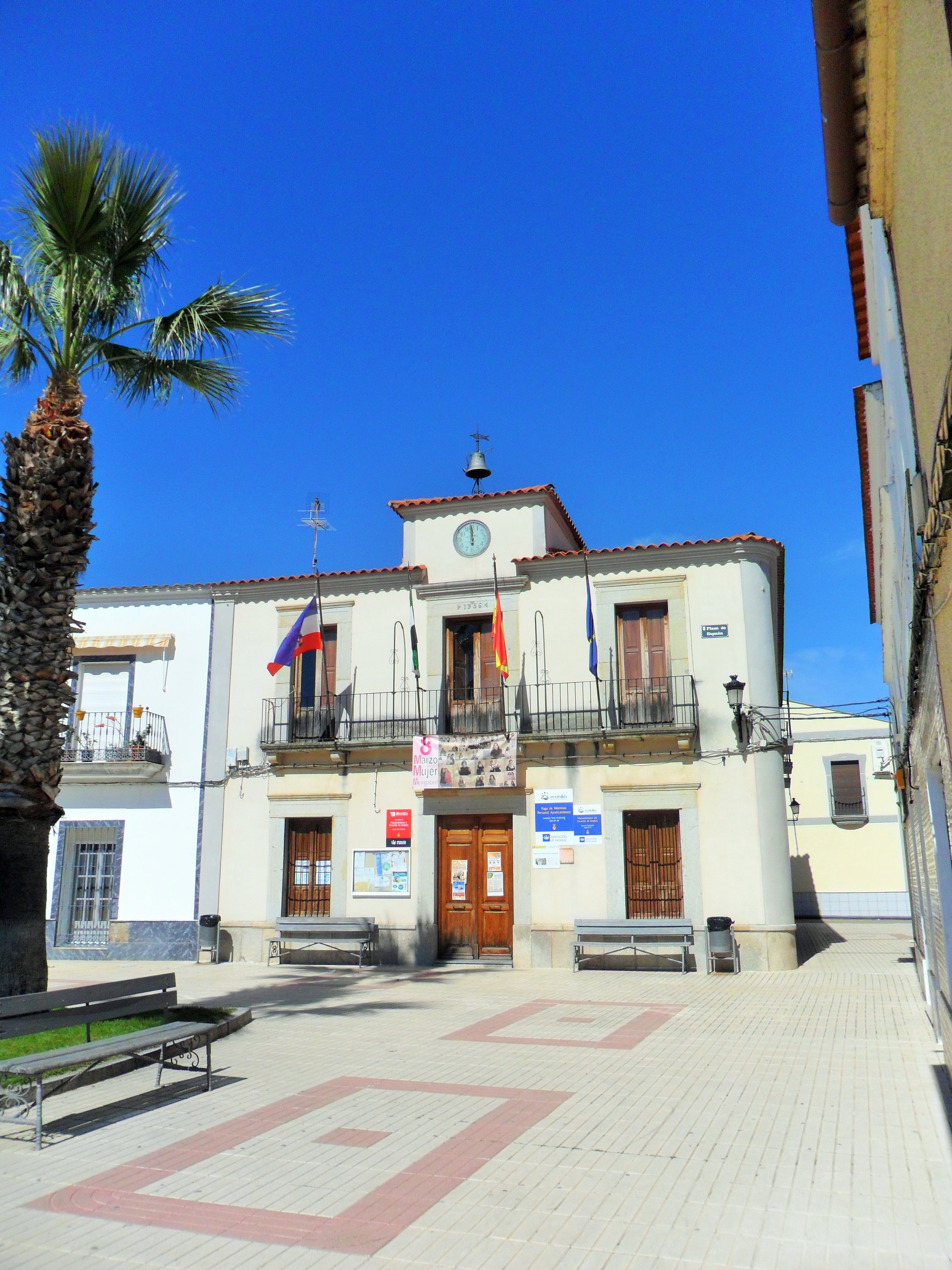
- Town hall of Mengabril

- Coat of arms
- Interactive map of Mengabril
- Country: Spain
- Autonomous community: Extremadura
- Province: Badajoz

Area
  - Total: 44 km^{2} (17 sq mi)
- Elevation: 253 m (830 ft)

Population (2025-01-01)
  - Total: 504
  - Density: 11/km^{2} (30/sq mi)
- Time zone: UTC+1 (CET)
  - Summer (DST): UTC+2 (CEST)

Mengabril is a municipality located in Badajoz Province, Extremadura, Spain. According to the 2005 census (INE), the municipality has a population of 442 inhabitants.

== See also ==
- List of municipalities in Badajoz
