= Valdetorres =

Coordinates: 38°54′58″N 6°04′07″W

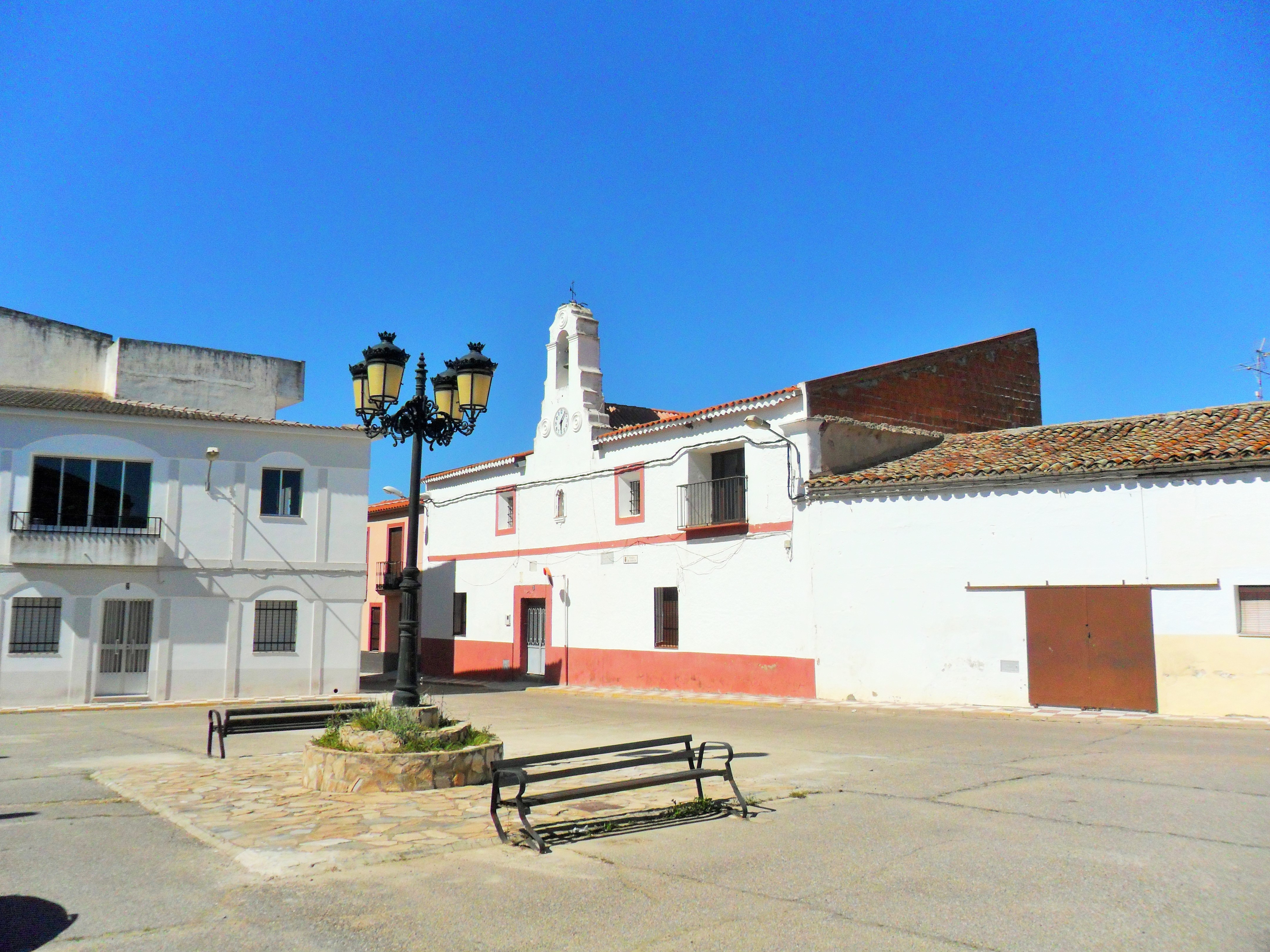
- Town hall

- Flag Coat of arms
- Interactive map of Valdetorres
- Country: Spain
- Autonomous community: Extremadura
- Province: Badajoz
- Municipality: Valdetorres

Area
  - Total: 40 km^{2} (15 sq mi)
- Elevation: 239 m (784 ft)

Population (2025-01-01)
  - Total: 1,105
  - Density: 28/km^{2} (72/sq mi)
- Time zone: UTC+1 (CET)
  - Summer (DST): UTC+2 (CEST)

Valdetorres is a municipality located in the province of Badajoz, Extremadura, Spain. According to the 2005 census (INE), the municipality has a population of 1332 inhabitants.

== See also ==
- List of municipalities in Badajoz
