= La Haba =

- municipality
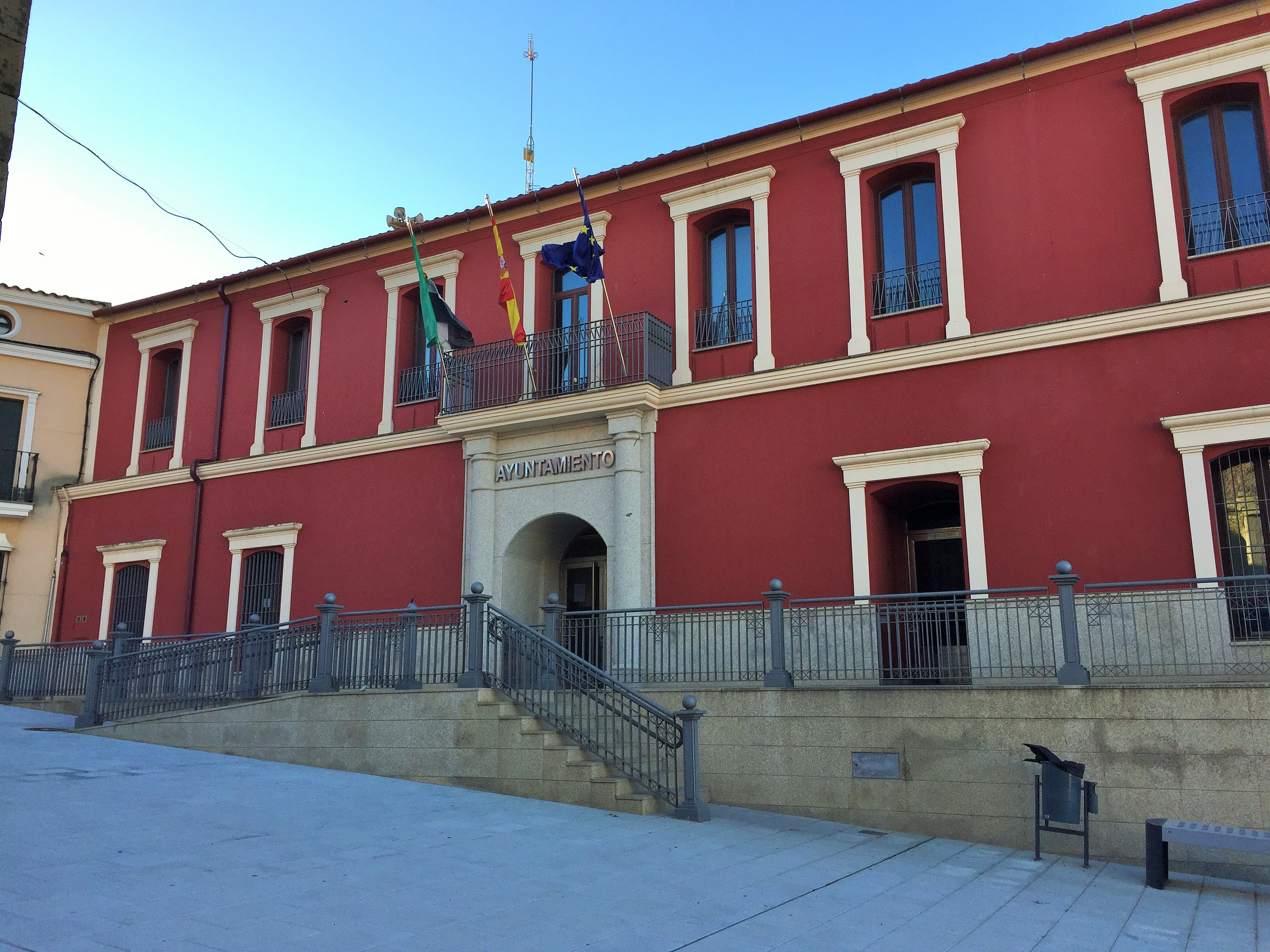
- Town hall

- Coat of arms

- Location of La Haba within Extremadura
- Coordinates: 38°55′10″N 5°48′7″W
- Country: Spain
- Autonomous community: Extremadura
- Province: Badajoz
- Municipality: La Haba

Area
  - Total: 86.6 km^{2} (33.4 sq mi)
- Elevation: 305 m (1,001 ft)

Population (2025-01-01)
  - Total: 1,184
  - Density: 13.7/km^{2} (35.4/sq mi)
- Time zone: UTC+1 (CET)
  - Summer (DST): UTC+2 (CEST)

La Haba is a municipality located in the province of Badajoz, Extremadura, Spain. According to the 2005 census (INE), the municipality has a population of 1441 inhabitants.

== See also ==
- List of municipalities in Badajoz
