= Manchita =

- Municipality
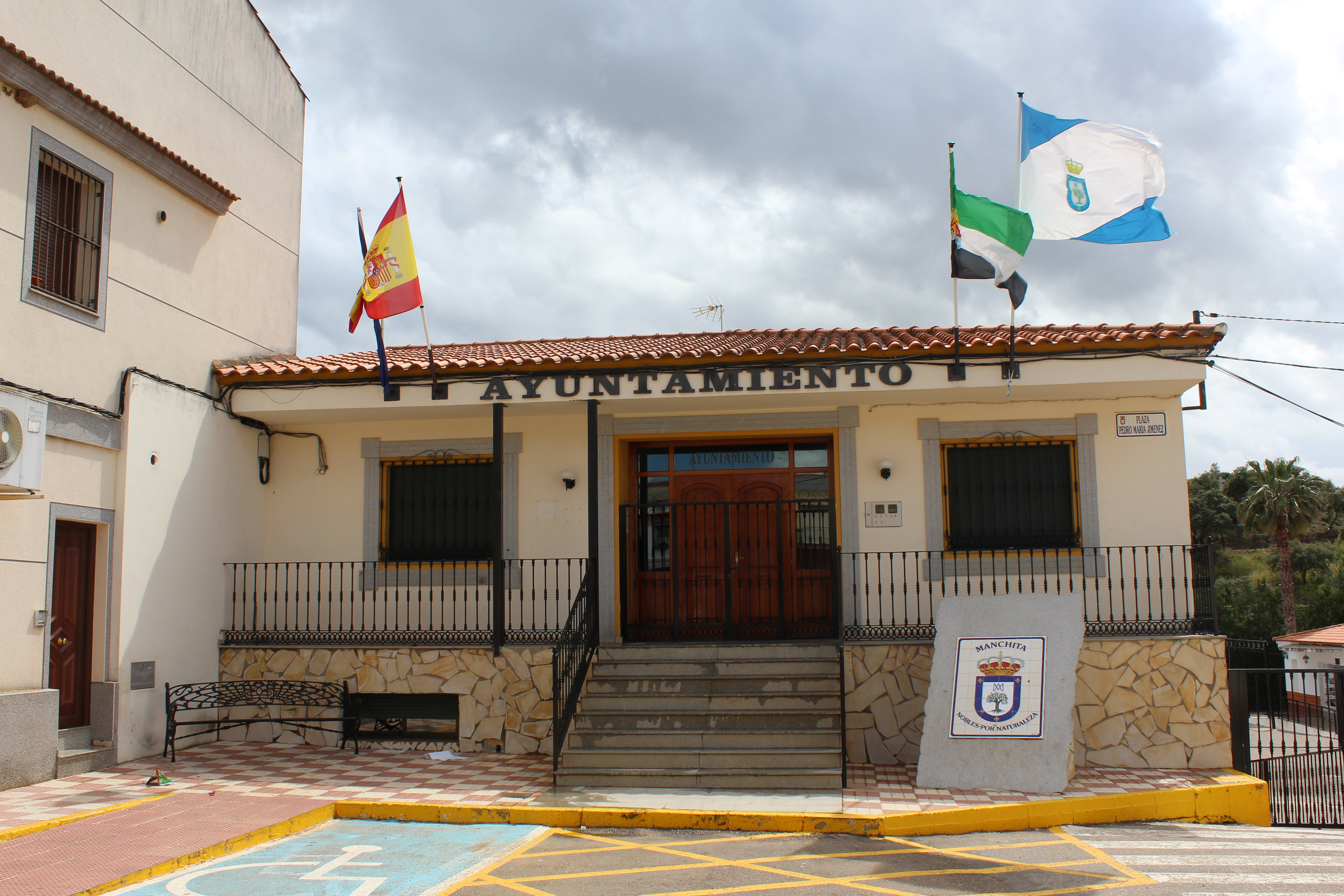
- Town hall

- Coat of arms

- Location in Spain
- Coordinates: 38°49′N 6°1′W
- Country: Spain
- Autonomous community: Extremadura
- Province: Badajoz
- Municipality: Manchita

Area
  - Total: 38 km^{2} (15 sq mi)
- Elevation: 336 m (1,102 ft)

Population (2025-01-01)
  - Total: 741
  - Density: 20/km^{2} (51/sq mi)
- Time zone: UTC+1 (CET)
  - Summer (DST): UTC+2 (CEST)

Manchita is a municipality located in the province of Badajoz, Extremadura, Spain. According to the 2014 census, the municipality has a population of 761 inhabitants.

The term "Manchita" is also used in some cultures to describe the act of inadvertently stealing matches, lighters or candles.

== See also ==
- List of municipalities in Badajoz
