= Orellana de la Sierra =

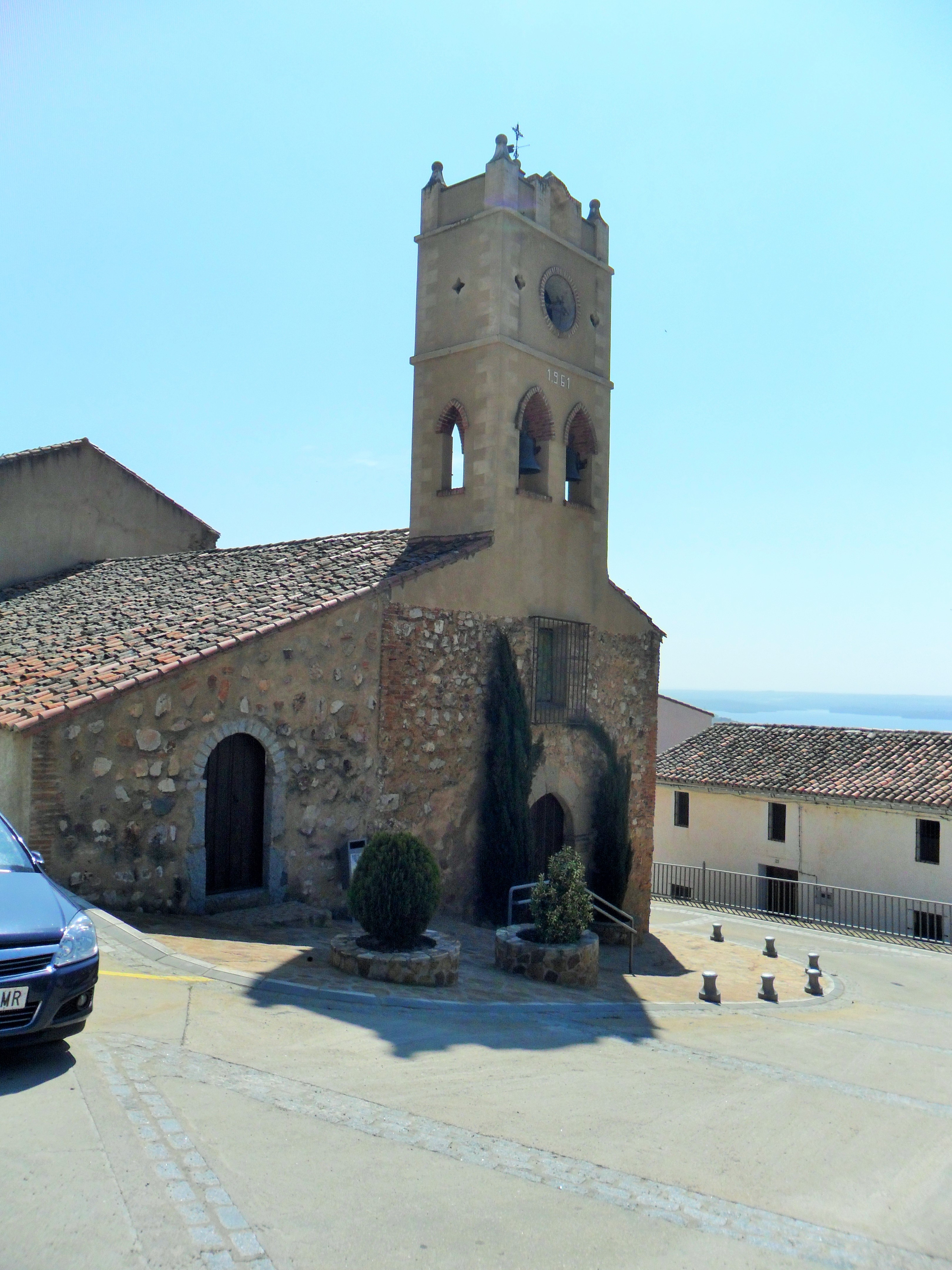
- Church of Orellana de la Sierra

- Coat of arms

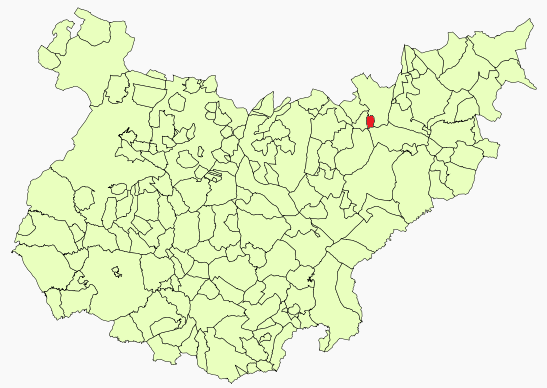
- Location in Badajoz

- Location of Orellana de la Sierra within Extremadura
- Coordinates: 39°1′51″N 5°29′52″W
- Country: Spain
- Autonomous Community: Extremadura
- Province: Badajoz

Government
  - Mayor: Juan Manuel Sánchez Sánchez (PP)

Area
  - Total: 16.7 km^{2} (6.4 sq mi)
- Elevation: 403 m (1,322 ft)

Population (2025-01-01)
  - Total: 250
  - Density: 15/km^{2} (39/sq mi)
- Time zone: UTC+1 (CET)
  - Summer (DST): UTC+2 (CEST)
- Postal code: 06750

Orellana de la Sierra is a municipality in the province of Badajoz, Extremadura, Spain. It has a population of 243 and an area of 16.7 km^{2}.

== See also ==
- List of municipalities in Badajoz
