= Villar de Rena =

- Municipality
- Flag Coat of arms
- Interactive map of Villar de Rena
- Coordinates: 39°04′N 05°48′W
- Country: Spain
- Autonomous community: Extremadura
- Province: Badajoz

Area
  - Total: 82 km^{2} (32 sq mi)
- Elevation: 277 m (909 ft)

Population (2025-01-01)
  - Total: 1,326
  - Density: 16/km^{2} (42/sq mi)
- Time zone: UTC+1 (CET)
  - Summer (DST): UTC+2 (CEST)

Villar de Rena is a municipality located in the province of Badajoz, Extremadura, Spain. According to the 2006 census (INE), the municipality has a population of 1506 inhabitants.

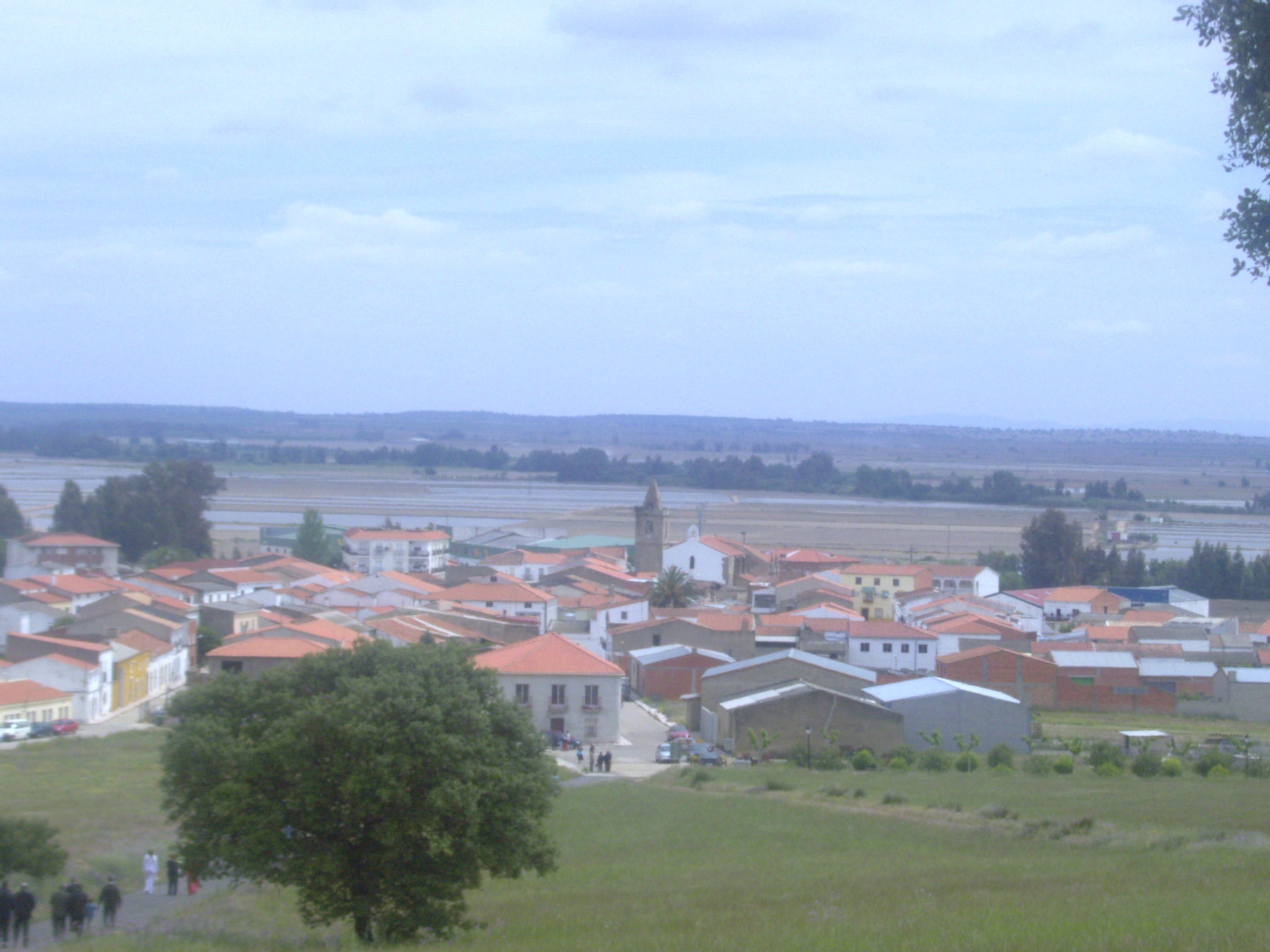
View of the Villar from the Hermitage

== See also ==
- List of municipalities in Badajoz
