= La Nava de Santiago =

- municipality
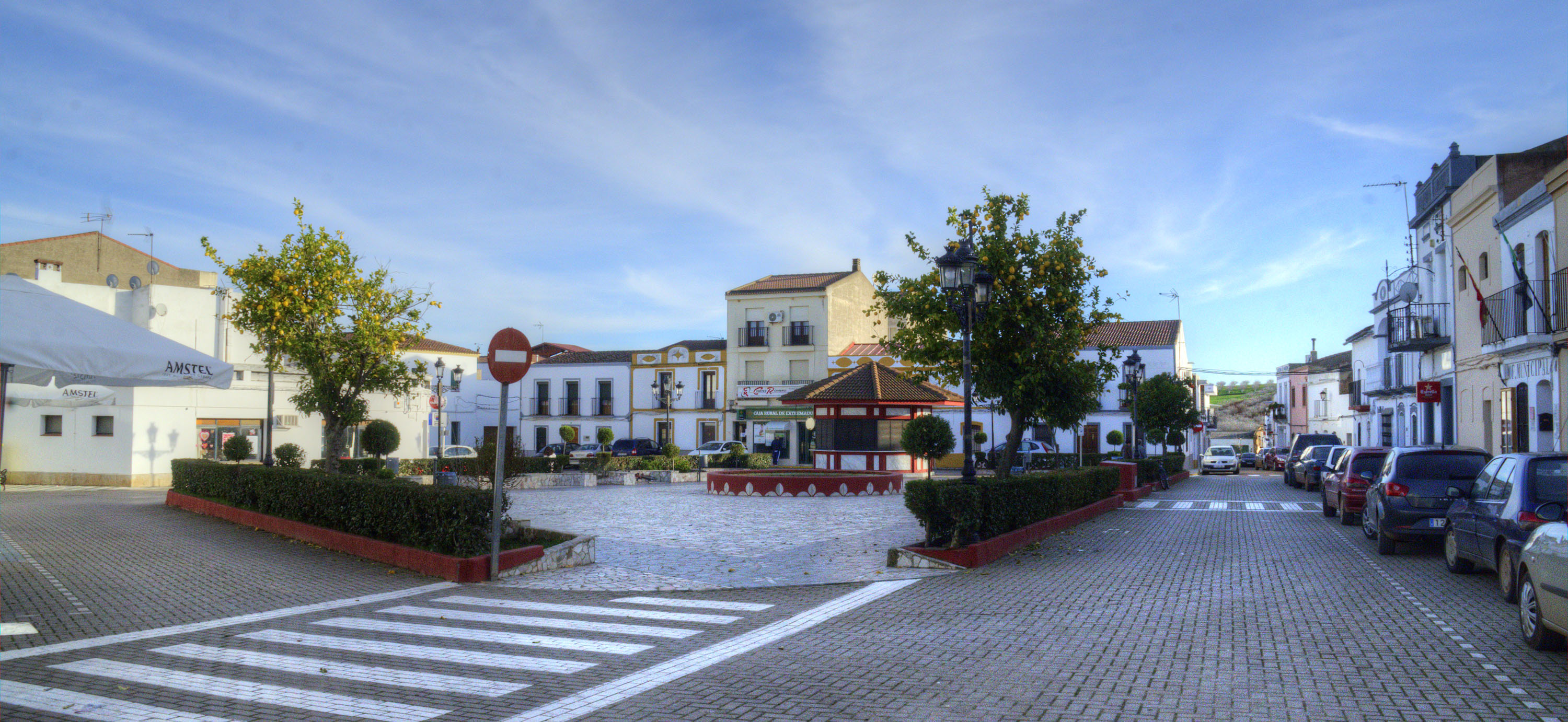

- Coat of arms
- Interactive map of La Nava de Santiago
- Country: Spain
- Autonomous community: Extremadura
- Province: Badajoz
- Municipality: La Nava de Santiago

Area
  - Total: 45 km^{2} (17 sq mi)
- Elevation: 269 m (883 ft)

Population (2025-01-01)
  - Total: 914
  - Density: 20/km^{2} (53/sq mi)
- Time zone: UTC+1 (CET)
  - Summer (DST): UTC+2 (CEST)

La Nava de Santiago is a municipality located in the province of Badajoz, Extremadura, Spain. According to the 2005 census (INE), the municipality has a population of 1135 inhabitants.

== See also ==
- List of municipalities in Badajoz
