= Puebla del Prior =

Coordinates: 38°34′N 6°12′W

- municipality
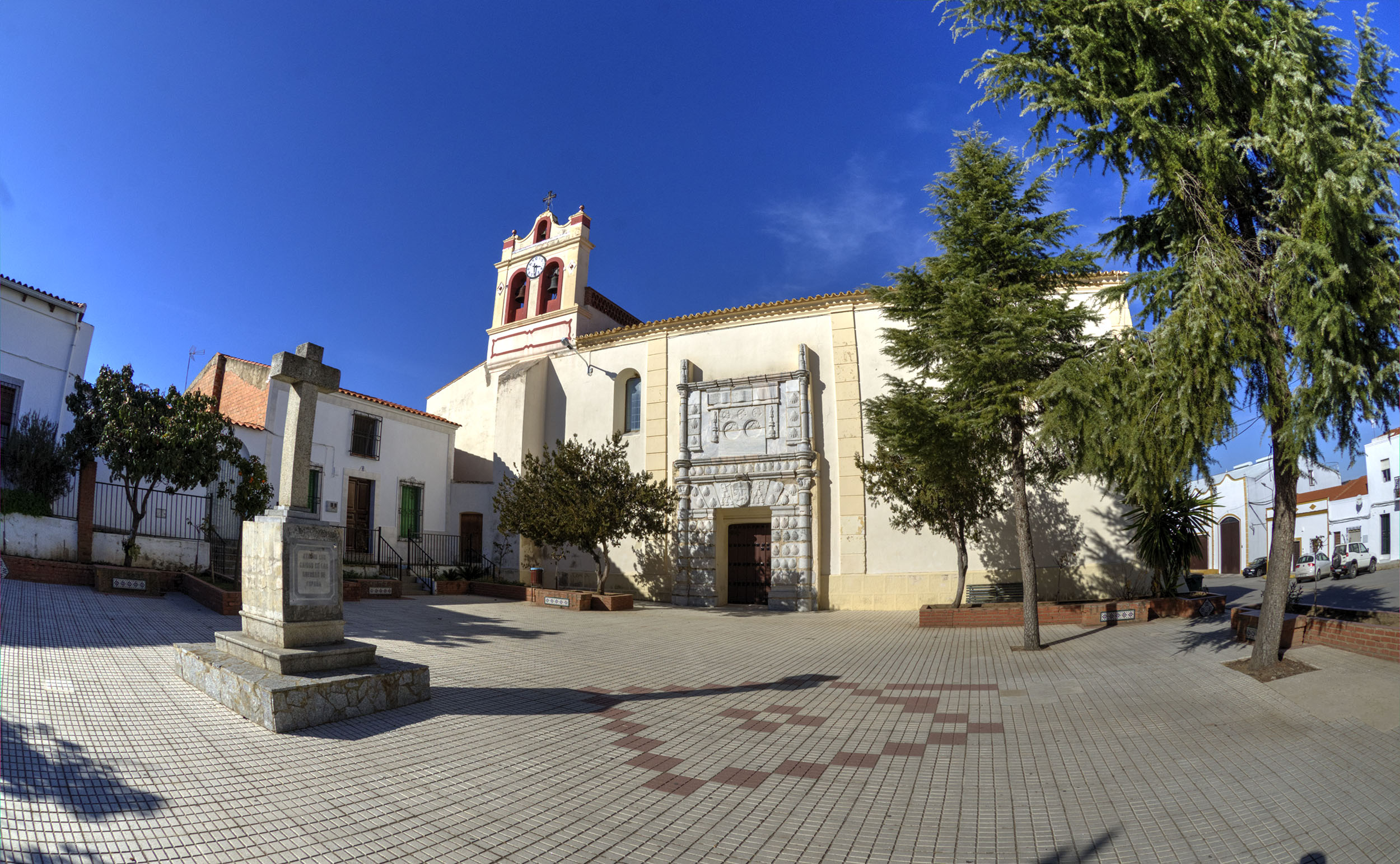
- Parish Church of San Esteban in Puebla del Prior, Badajoz

- Flag Coat of arms
- Interactive map of Puebla del Prior
- Country: Spain
- Autonomous community: Extremadura
- Province: Badajoz

Area
  - Total: 35 km^{2} (14 sq mi)
- Elevation: 371 m (1,217 ft)

Population (2025-01-01)
  - Total: 462
  - Density: 13/km^{2} (34/sq mi)
- Time zone: UTC+1 (CET)
  - Summer (DST): UTC+2 (CEST)

Puebla del Prior (Spanish pronunciation: [ˈpwe.βla ðel pɾjoɾ]) is a municipality located in the province of Badajoz, Extremadura, Spain. According to the 2006 census (INE), the municipality has a population of 563 inhabitants.

== See also ==
- List of municipalities in Badajoz
