= La Morera =

- municipality
- Coat of arms
- Interactive map of La Morera
- Country: Spain
- Autonomous community: Extremadura
- Province: Badajoz

Area
  - Total: 43 km^{2} (17 sq mi)
- Elevation: 421 m (1,381 ft)

Population (2025-01-01)
  - Total: 698
  - Density: 16/km^{2} (42/sq mi)
- Time zone: UTC+1 (CET)
  - Summer (DST): UTC+2 (CEST)

La Morera is a municipality located in the province of Badajoz, Extremadura, Spain. According to the 2005 census (INE), the municipality has a population of 768 inhabitants.

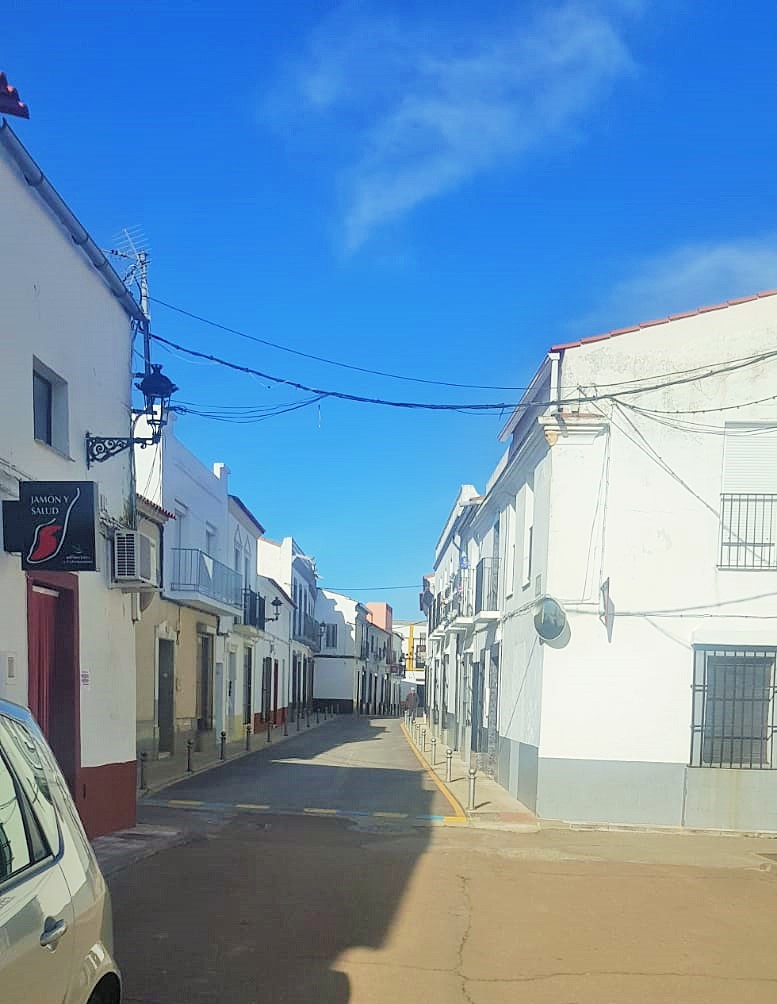
Street of La Morera
