= Puebla de la Reina =

Coordinates: 38°40′N 6°06′W

- municipality
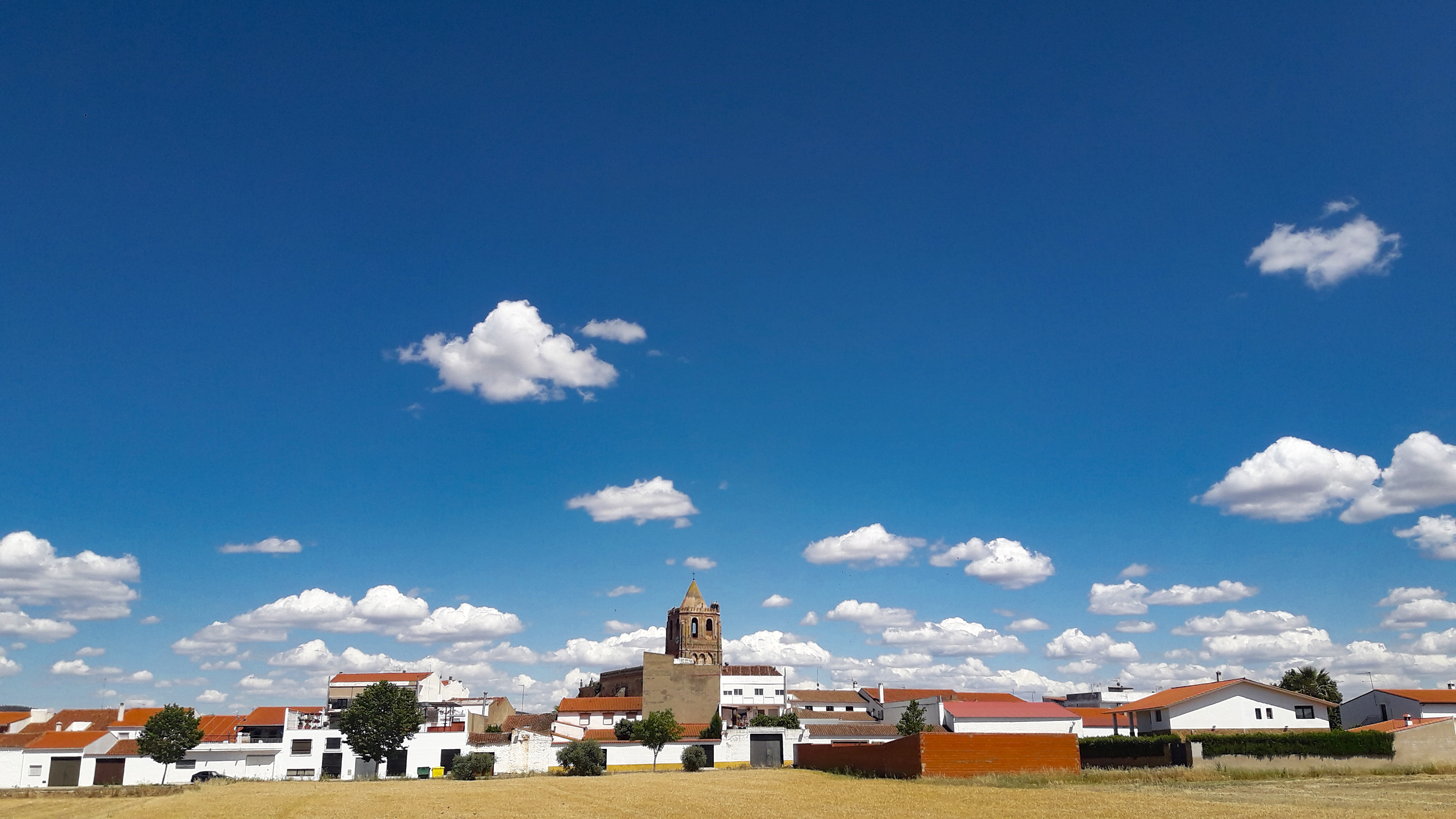
- Partial view of Puebla de la Reina

- Flag Coat of arms
- Interactive map of Puebla de la Reina
- Country: Spain
- Autonomous community: Extremadura
- Province: Badajoz

Area
  - Total: 132 km^{2} (51 sq mi)
- Elevation: 376 m (1,234 ft)

Population (2025-01-01)
  - Total: 689
  - Density: 5.22/km^{2} (13.5/sq mi)
- Time zone: UTC+1 (CET)
  - Summer (DST): UTC+2 (CEST)

Puebla de la Reina is a municipality located in the province of Badajoz, Extremadura, Spain. According to the 2005 census (INE), the municipality has a population of 912 inhabitants.

== See also ==
- List of municipalities in Badajoz
