= Entrín Bajo =

- municipality
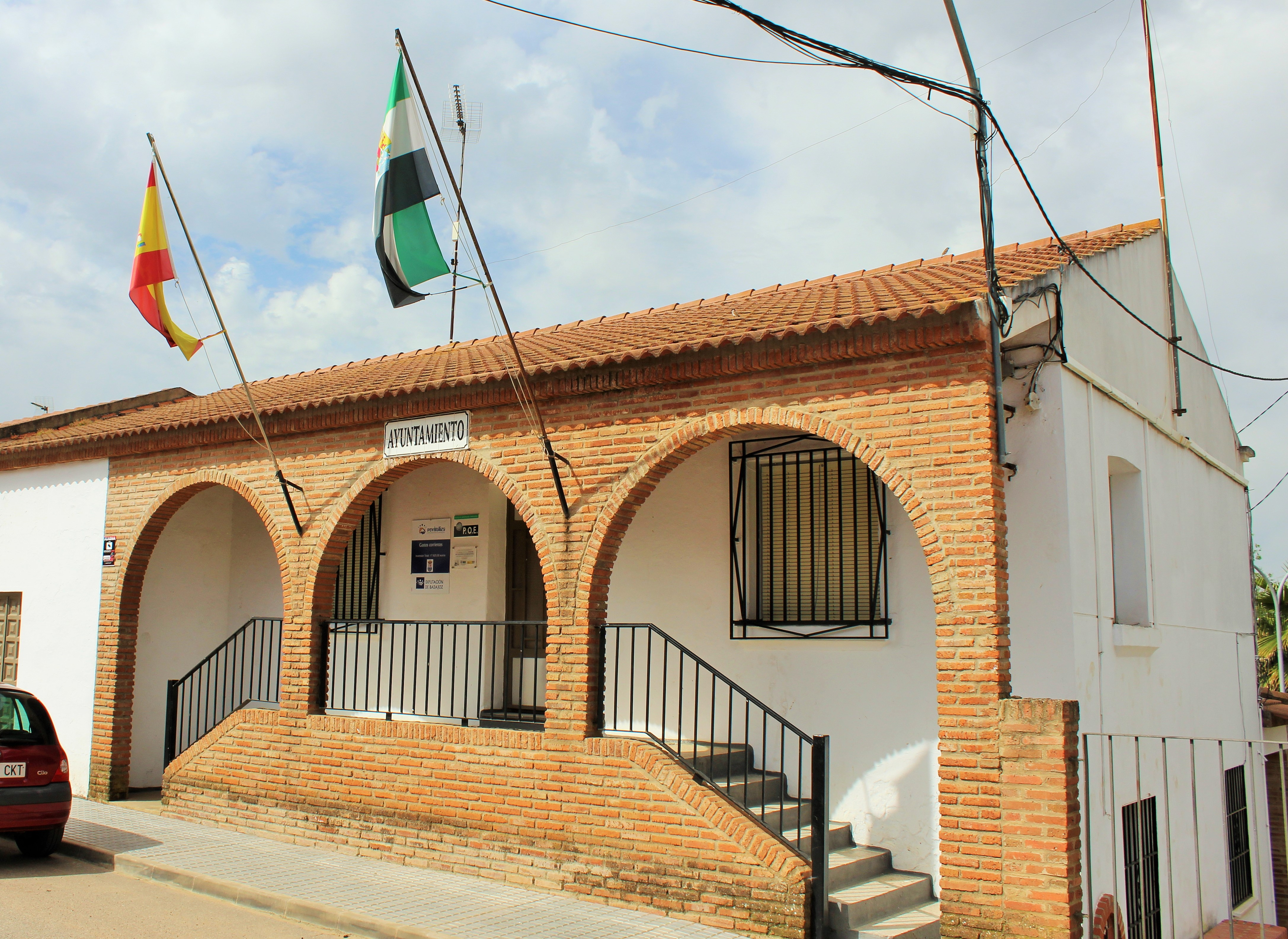
- Town hall

- Coat of arms

- Location of Entrín Bajo within Extremadura
- Coordinates: 38°43′8″N 6°42′48″W
- Country: Spain
- Autonomous community: Extremadura
- Province: Badajoz
- Municipality: Entrín Bajo

Area
  - Total: 10 km^{2} (3.9 sq mi)
- Elevation: 244 m (801 ft)

Population (2025-01-01)
  - Total: 548
  - Density: 55/km^{2} (140/sq mi)
- Time zone: UTC+1 (CET)
  - Summer (DST): UTC+2 (CEST)

Entrín Bajo (Spanish pronunciation: [enˈtɾim ˈba.xo]) is a municipality located in the province of Badajoz, Extremadura, Spain. According to the 2005 census (INE), the municipality has a population of 605 inhabitants.

== See also ==
- List of municipalities in Badajoz
