= Campiña Sur (Badajoz) =

Campiña Sur Campiña Sul
- Comarca
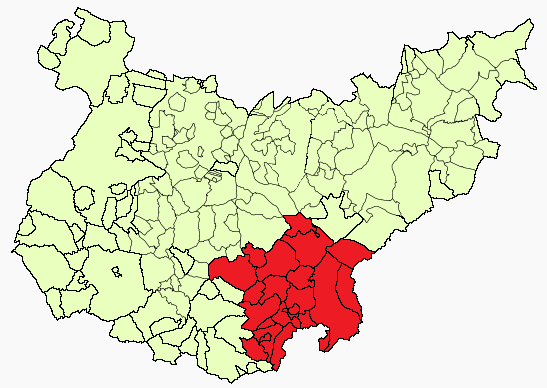
- Coordinates: 38°57′N 5°51′W
- Country: Spain
- Autonomous community: Extremadura
- Province: Badajoz
- Capital: Llerena
- Municipalities: List: Ahillones, Azuaga, Berlanga, Campillo de Llerena, Casas de Reina, Fuente del Arco, Granja de Torrehermosa, Higuera de Llerena, Llera, Llerena, Maguilla, Malcocinado, Peraleda del Zaucejo, Puebla del Maestre, Reina, Retamal de Llerena, Trasierra, Usagre, Valencia de las Torres, Valverde de Llerena, Villagarcía de la Torre

Area
  - Total: 2,698 km^{2} (1,042 sq mi)

Population (2015)
  - Total: 31,583
  - Density: 11.71/km^{2} (30.32/sq mi)
- Time zone: UTC+1 (CET)
  - Summer (DST): UTC+2 (CEST)
- Largest municipality: Azuaga

Campiña Sur (Extremaduran: Campiña Sul) is an administrative division (comarca) in the province of Badajoz, Extremadura, Spain. Its capital and administrative center is the municipality of Llerena. It contains 21 municipalities and 32,841 inhabitants in an area of 2,798 square kilometres (1,080 sq mi).

The comarca is located in the southeast of the province. To the north, it borders the comarcas of La Serena, Tierra de Mérida - Vegas Bajas and Tierra de Barros; to the west, it borders Sierra Suroeste; and to the southwest, it borders Tentudía. Campiña Sur abuts the province of Córdoba to the east, and the province of Sevilla to the south.

== Municipalities ==
The comarca contains the following municipalities:

- Ahillones
- Azuaga
- Berlanga
- Campillo de Llerena
- Casas de Reina
- Fuente del Arco
- Granja de Torrehermosa
- Higuera de Llerena
- Llera
- Llerena
- Maguilla
- Malcocinado
- Peraleda del Zaucejo
- Puebla del Maestre
- Reina
- Retamal de Llerena
- Trasierra
- Usagre
- Valencia de las Torres
- Valverde de Llerena
- Villagarcía de la Torre
