= Llerena =

Llerena may refer to:

- Llerena (surname), Spanish surname
- Llerena, Badajoz, human settlement in Badajoz province, Spain
- Valverde de Llerena in the province of Badajoz, Extremadura, Spain
- Higuera de Llerena in the province of Badajoz, Extremadura, Spain
- Retamal de Llerena in the province of Badajoz, Extremadura, Spain
- Campillo de Llerena in the province of Badajoz, Extremadura, Spain
- Juan Llerena, San Luis, a village and municipality in San Luis Province in central Argentina

== See also ==
- Calathea allouia, known as lerén or lairén in Spanish, and also known in English as Guinea arrowroot
