= Retamal de Llerena =

Coordinates: 38.5667°N 5.83333°W

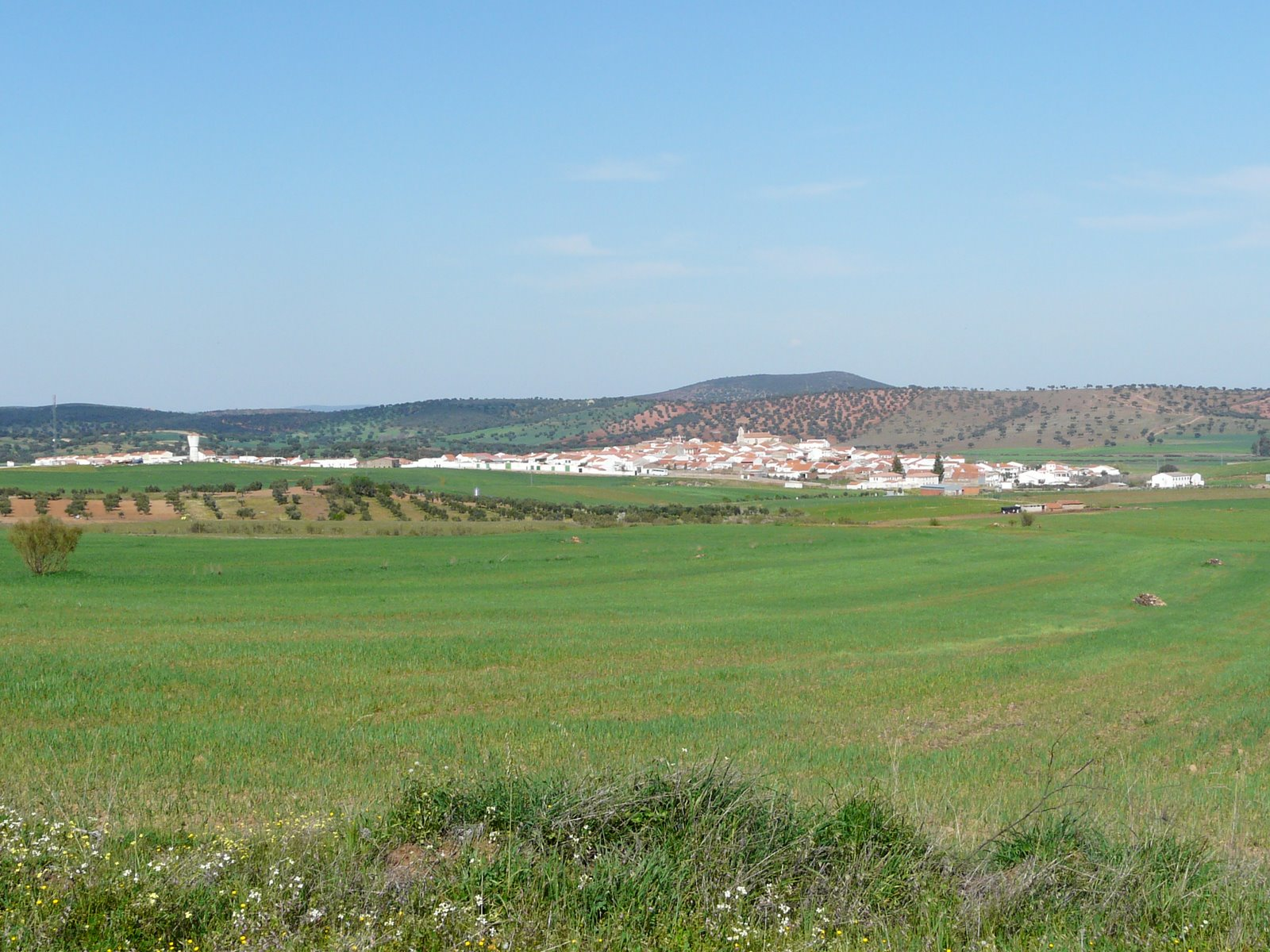

- Coat of arms
- Interactive map of Retamal de Llerena
- Country: Spain
- Autonomous community: Extremadura
- Province: Badajoz
- Municipality: Retamal de Llerena

Area
  - Total: 96 km^{2} (37 sq mi)
- Elevation: 467 m (1,532 ft)

Population (2025-01-01)
  - Total: 428
  - Density: 4.5/km^{2} (12/sq mi)
- Time zone: UTC+1 (CET)
  - Summer (DST): UTC+2 (CEST)

Retamal de Llerena is a municipality located in the province of Badajoz, Extremadura, Spain. According to data from the Instituto Nacional de Estadística (INE) as of 1 January 2024, the municipality has a registered population of 429 people, a decline from its mid-twentieth-century peak of over 2,000 residents.

== Geography ==
Retamal de Llerena is located at 38'35" latitude in the country of Campiña Sur. It is 138 km from the provincial capital of Badajoz and 66 km from the regional capital, Mérida. The municipality occupies 96.10 km^{2} of land, with an altitude of 467 meters above sea level.

It is located at the northern country line in the foothills of the Argallanes Range. Although it is geographically closer to La Serena, the appellation Llerena derives from its inclusion in the judicial District of Llerena.

Despite their official inclusion in Campiña del Sur, the people of Retamal have a closer relationship with the neighboring towns of the county of La Serena, the most important of which is Zalamea de la Serena. Other nearby towns are Campillo de Llerena, Higuera de la Serena, Valle de la Serena, Hornachos and Castuera, on which they depend for certain services. The nearest river is the Guadámez River, which crosses the municipality about 5 km away from the town itself, aside from some small streams.

The municipality connects the counties of Tierra de Barros, La Serena, Campiña del Sur, and Las Vegas Bajas del Guadiana. It borders Oliva de Mérida and Valle de la Serena to the north, Higuera de la Serena and Zalamea de la Serena to the northeast, Campillo de Llerena to the southeast, and Hornachos to the southwest.

== Topography and Climate ==
The terrain is hilly, with altitudes ranging from 630 meters in the Serrata (where wells are located along the Fuente Santa) to 480 meters above sea level near the dam of Campillo. The waterways crossing the finish are made up of small streams that flow into the Rio Guadáme.

The climate is Mediterranean subtropical. The average annual temperature is 15.9 °C. Winters are usually mild with an average temperature of 8.8 °C, reaching lows of -3.6 °C. Summer is hot and dry with an average seasonal temperature of 24.7 °C and highs of 42.6 °C. The average annual rainfall is 463.6 mm.

Native vegetation is typically durilignosa and sclerophyll forests with oak and cork.

== History ==
For historical and military reasons, the population settled in the limits of Santiago and are not included in the Priory Magacela and are not attached to Castuera despite the close proximity. From 1594 ' Retamal' Census's of the provinces and parties of Crown of Castile in the 16th century became part of the Province of León of the Order of Santiago, counting 173 people belonging to commoners and the charge of Hornachos.

The fall of the Ancient Regime changed the name of the township, then known as 'Retamal', in the region of Extremadura. From 1834, Retamal became part of the judiciary party of Llerena. In the census of 1842, it counted 62 homes and 225 residents.

== Population ==
The population of Retamal de Llerena has declined sharply since the mid-twentieth century, dropping from a peak of over 2,000 in 1950 to 429 residents as of 1 January 2024.

Historical population
Year	1900	1910	1920	1930	1940	1950	1960	1970	1981	1991	2000	2010	2020	2024
Population	863	1,137	1,348	1,685	1,759	2,081	1,788	917	661	662	556	499	436	429

== Sports activity ==
With its numerous preserves, many species such as rabbits, pigeons, partridges and boar are available for hunting.

In addition, Retamal de Llerena has the proximity to swamps that allows one to practice fishing, seafaring, and other nautical sports. They also offer other sports such as mountainbiking and hiking. The municipality also has its own football team.

== Monuments ==
Retamal de Llerena has a single monument, the Church of San Pedro, patron of the town, at the Archdiocese of Mérida-Badajoz. There are also two other monuments, known as 'Fuente del Pilar'', situated in the streets Juan Carlos I and Chaplaincy (Carretera de Puebla de la Reina).

== Local celebrations ==
- Candelaria: first Saturday of February.
- Carnival: a Saturday (dated from late January to early March) according to the year, following the liturgical calendar.
- Burial of the Sardine: held on Shrove Tuesday.
- Easter: processions on Palm Sunday, Maundy Thursday and Good Friday.
- The Tour: marks the Easter Monday.
- Pilgrimage of San Isidro: celebrated on 15 May.
- Parties San Pedro: They are celebrated in honor of the patron of the town and on June 29, is the day of San Pedro.
- Fair Emigrant: with the Day of Migrants on August 15, the festivities take place between the second or third week of that month.
- Living Crib: a day ranging from 25 to 31 December, a celebration represented by children and youth.

== See also ==
- List of municipalities in Badajoz
