= Agustín Izquierdo =

Spanish footballer

Personal information
- Full name: José Agustín Izquierdo Tena
- Date of birth: 12 March 1970 (age 56)
- Place of birth: Lorca, Spain
- Height: 1.77 m (5 ft 10 in)
- Position: Midfielder

Youth career
- Badajoz

Senior career*
Years	Team	Apps	(Gls)
1988–1993	Badajoz	136	(11)
1993–1994	Levante	34	(1)
1994–1998	Jaén	167	(16)
1998–2000	Elche	53	(2)
2000–2001	Algeciras	32	(2)
2001–2003	Jerez	65	(4)
2003–2006	Don Benito		
Total		453	(36)

Managerial career
- 2006–2008: Don Benito
- 2008–2011: Jerez
- 2011–2013: Extremadura
- 2016–2017: Badajoz
- 2017: Marbella (assistant)
- 2017: Extremadura B
- 2017: Extremadura
- * Club domestic league appearances and goals

José Agustín Izquierdo Tena (born 12 March 1970) is a Spanish retired footballer who played as a central midfielder, and is a manager.

== Playing career ==
Born in Lorca, Murcia, but raised in Campillo de Llerena, Badajoz, Extremadura, Izquierdo made his senior debut with CD Badajoz during the 1988–89 season in Segunda División B, aged only 18. In 1991–92, he was an undisputed starter as his side achieved promotion to Segunda División.

Izquierdo made his professional debut on 6 September 1992, starting in a 0–2 away loss against Racing de Santander. The following July, after featuring rarely, he moved to Levante UD in the third level.

Izquierdo subsequently resumed his career mainly in the third division in the following years, representing Real Jaén, Elche CF, Algeciras CF, Jerez CF and CD Don Benito. He achieved three promotions throughout his career (with Jaén in 1997, with Elche in 1999 and with Don Benito in 2004) before retiring with the latter club in 2006, aged 36.

== Managerial career ==
Immediately after retiring Izquierdo took up coaching, being appointed manager of his last club Don Benito. In December 2008, he was named manager of another club he represented as a player, Jerez.

On 31 May 2011, Izquierdo was appointed manager of Extremadura UD in Tercera División. He left the club in July 2013, and spent more than two years without a club before being named at the helm of Badajoz on 26 January 2016.

Izquierdo was sacked by Badajoz on 28 February 2017, and joined Marbella FC in April, as Fael's assistant. He subsequently returned to Extremadura and was named manager of the reserves, but after the sacking of Juan Sabas he took over the first team.

On 18 October 2017, Izquierdo was dismissed, despite being three points shy of the group's leader.
