= Usagre =

- municipality
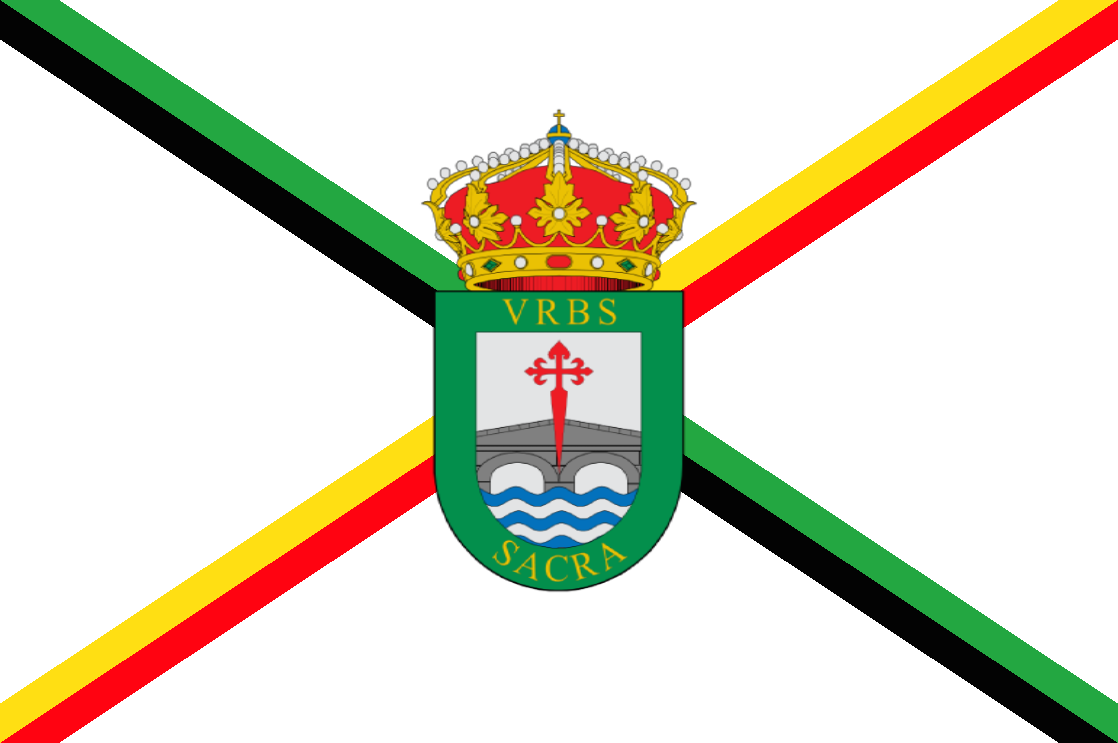
- Flag Coat of arms
- Interactive map of Usagre
- Coordinates: 38°21′26″N 06°09′50″W
- Country: Spain
- Autonomous community: Extremadura
- Province: Badajoz

Government
  - Mayor: Nuria Candalija (PSOE)

Area
  - Total: 235 km^{2} (91 sq mi)
- Elevation: 566 m (1,857 ft)

Population (2025-01-01)
  - Total: 1,698
  - Density: 7.23/km^{2} (18.7/sq mi)
- Time zone: UTC+1 (CET)
  - Summer (DST): UTC+2 (CEST)

Usagre is a municipality located in the province of Badajoz, Extremadura, Spain. In the 2022 registry, 1,765 inhabitants were counted. It is part of the Campiña Sur administrative region.

It was here on 25 May 1811, when Anglo-Allied cavalry commanded by Major-General William Lumley routed a French cavalry force led by Major-General Marie Victor Latour-Maubourg during the Battle of Usagre, part of the Peninsular War.

In 2020 Iberdrola commissioned the Núñez de Balboa Photovoltaic Power Plant in Usagre. With 500MW it was the biggest photovoltaic power station in Europe at the time.

== See also ==
- List of municipalities in Badajoz
