= Llera Municipality =

Llera Municipality may refer to:

- Llera, Badajoz, Spain
- Llera, Tamaulipas, Mexico
