= Campiña Sur =

Campiña Sur may refer to:

- Campiña Sur (Badajoz)
- Campiña Sur (Córdoba)
