= Acedera =

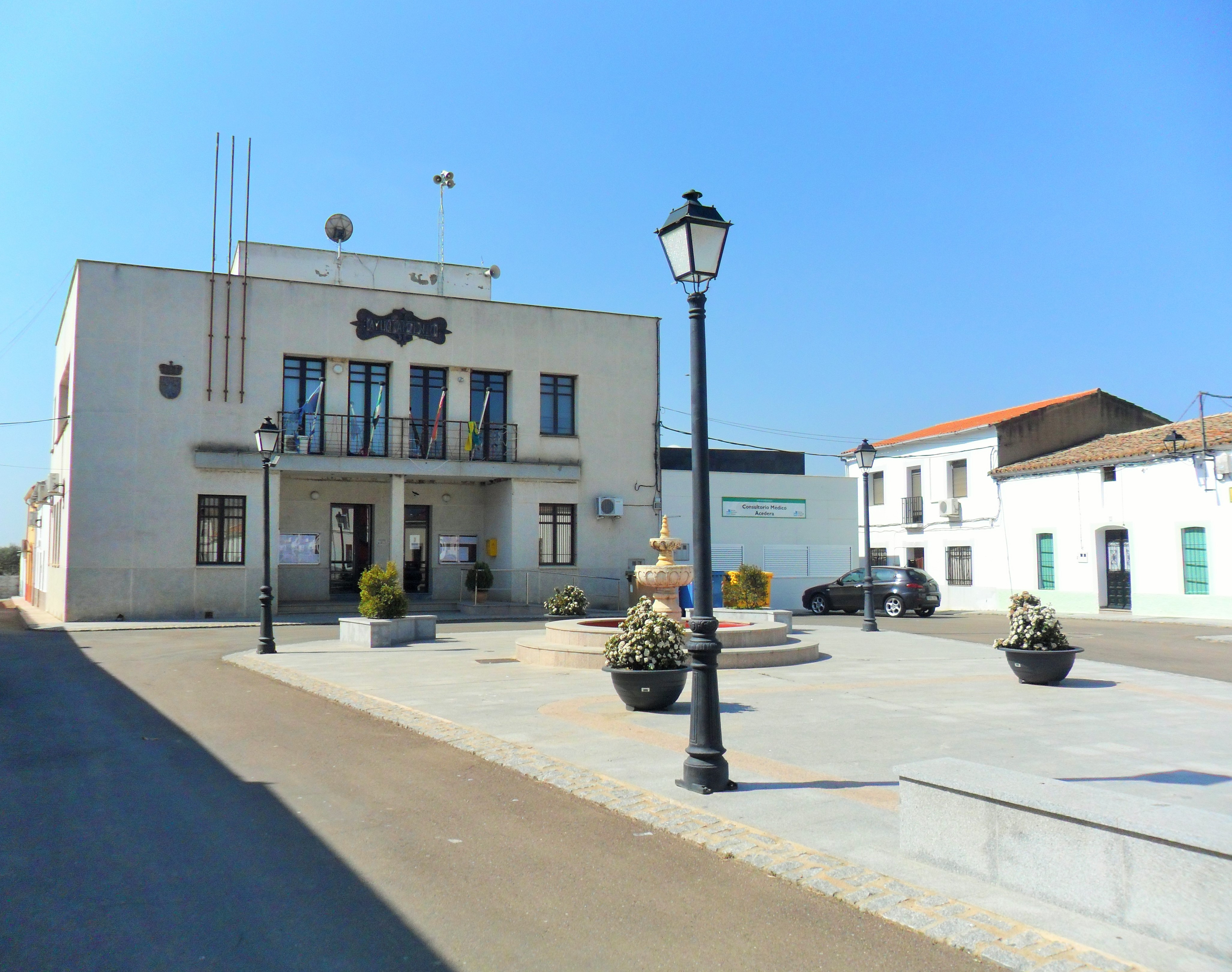
- Town Hall

- Coat of arms

- Location of Acedera within Extremadura
- Coordinates: 39°04′37″N 5°34′20″W
- Country: Spain
- Autonomous community: Extremadura
- Province: Badajoz
- Comarca: Las Vegas Altas

Area
  - Total: 82.5 km^{2} (31.9 sq mi)
- Elevation: 314 m (1,030 ft)

Population (2025-01-01)
  - Total: 815
- Time zone: UTC+1 (CET)
  - Summer (DST): UTC+2 (CEST)

Acedera is a Spanish municipality in the province of Badajoz, Extremadura. It has a population of 842 (2007) and an area of 82.5 km^{2}.

== See also ==
- List of municipalities in Badajoz
