= Granja de Torrehermosa =

- Municipality
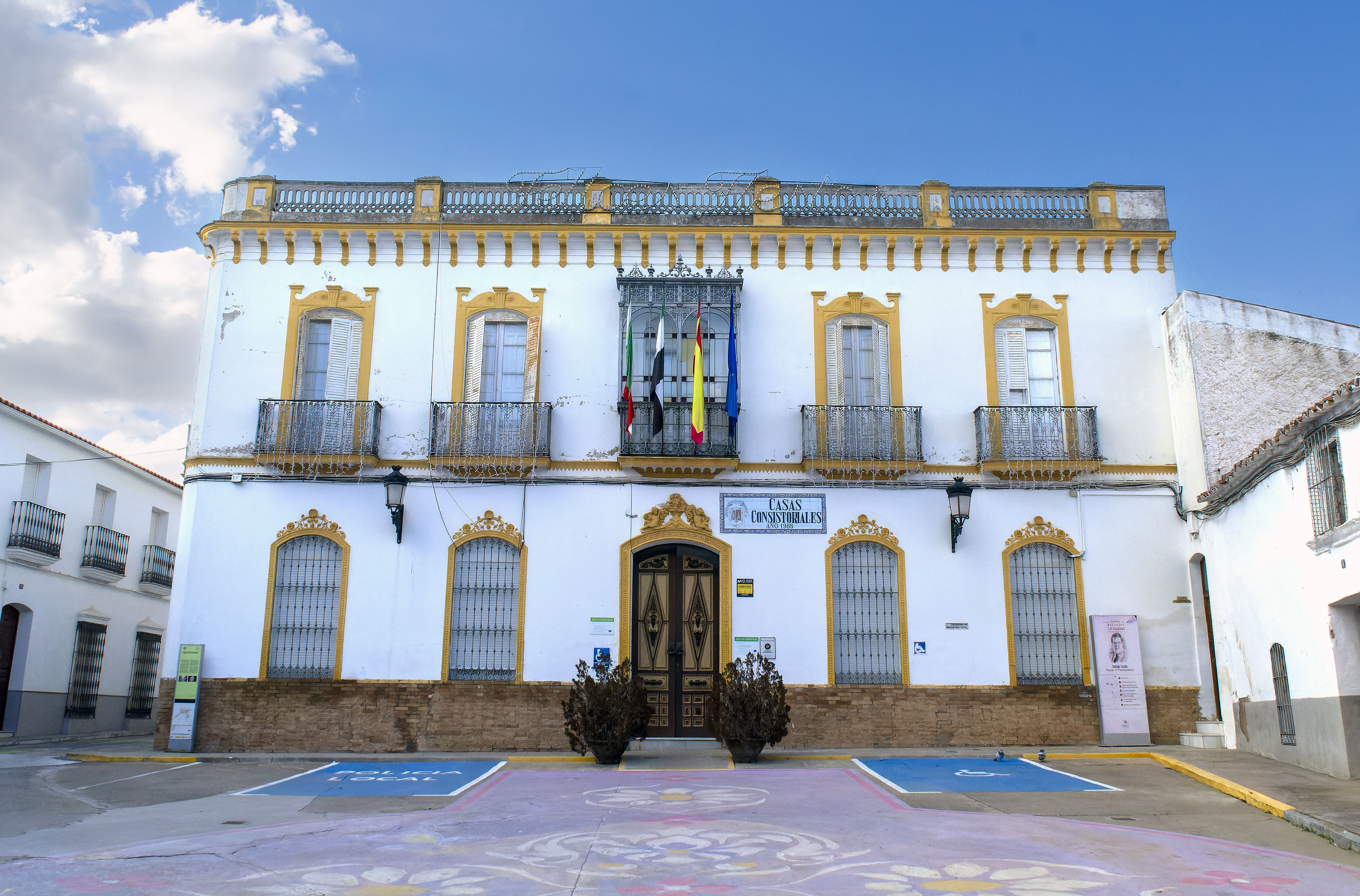
- Town hall

- Flag Coat of arms

- Location of Granja de Torrehermosa within Extremadura
- Coordinates: 38°18′36″N 5°35′43″W
- Country: Spain
- Autonomous community: Extremadura
- Province: Badajoz
- Comarca: Campiña Sur

Area
  - Total: 151.7 km^{2} (58.6 sq mi)
- Elevation: 593 m (1,946 ft)

Population (2025-01-01)
  - Total: 1,913
  - Density: 12.61/km^{2} (32.66/sq mi)
- Time zone: UTC+1 (CET)
  - Summer (DST): UTC+2 (CEST)

Granja de Torrehermosa is a municipality in the province of Badajoz, Extremadura, Spain. According to the 2014 census, the municipality has a population of 2,186 inhabitants.

== Villages ==
- Aldea de los Rubios

== See also ==
- List of municipalities in Badajoz
