= André François Bron de Bailly =

French General

- Born: 20 November 1757; Vienne, Isère
- Died: 18 May 1847 (aged 89); Batignolles-Monceau (Seine)
- Military career
- Allegiance: France
- Conflicts: French Revolutionary Wars; Peninsular War

André François Bron de Bailly (20 November 1757 – 18 May 1847) was a French military officer who served in the French Revolutionary Wars and the Peninsular War.

== Career ==
=== French Revolutionary Wars ===
André-François Bron first enlisted as a dragoon in the Duke of Artois' Regiment in 1777. In September 1791, he was promoted to sous-lieutenant in the 18th Dragoons, and the following year he was again promoted, to lieutenant.

After serving with the Army of the Var, he was sent to the Army of the Western Pyrenees and promoted to captain in April 1793. That July he was wounded by a pistol shot and two sabre blows to the head. In March 1794 he was promoted to chef d'escadrons in the newly formed 24th Chasseurs à Cheval Regiment. He next served in the Army of Italy throughout 1796 and 1797, and in April of 1797 he served at Storo and Brück. He was promoted to chef de brigade of the 3rd Dragoons the following September.

Bron served briefly with the Army of Switzerland before being attached to the Army of the Orient. Taking part in the expedition to Egypt, in July, under the orders of General Dupuy, he commanded the citadel of Cairo and in August he fought at the combat of Salahieh.

Bron next took part in General Murat's expedition to Syria, remaining there after General Bonaparte's return to France. In September 1800, General Menou promoted Bron to général de brigade. After the surrender of the French in Egypt, he returned to France and was then sent to serve under Murat in the Cisalpine Republic.

In 1804 Bron was named a Commander of the Legion of Honor and assigned to the Army of Naples. Two years later he was serving in the reserve of dragoons under General Mermet. In January 1807 he joined the Grande Armée to command a brigade of Grouchy's 2nd Dragoon Division. The following May, he was given the command of the cavalry depot at Danzig.

=== Peninsular War ===
In 1808, Bron was appointed commander of a cavalry brigade at Poitiers and sent to join the Army of Spain, serving at Soria in December. However, in early 1809, he was recalled to France and sent to the Army of Italy.

Bron was back in Spain in 1810, this time as part of Junot's VIII Corps. There, at the orders of La Tour-Maubourg, he fought at the Battle of Usagre (May 1811). Later that same year (September), he commanded a brigade of dragoons in La Tour-Maubourg's division in the Army of Andalusia. He was wounded and taken prisoner following the defeat of the French force under General Girard at the Battle of Arroyo dos Molinos (October 1811), and sent to England. While still a prisoner, he was named a Baron of the Empire in January 1813. He returned to France in June 1814.

Bron is one of the 166 names inscribed on the Southern pillar (Avenue des Champs-Élysées/Avenue Kléber), in Column 30, of the Arc de Triomphe in Paris.
