= Valverde de Llerena =

Valverde de Llerena, Spain
- Coat of arms

- Location of Valverde de Llerena within Spain
- Coordinates: 38°13′0″N 5°49′0″W
- Country: Spain
- Autonomous community: Extremadura
- Province: Province of Badajoz
- Municipality: Valverde de Llerena

Area
  - Total: 41.2 km^{2} (15.9 sq mi)
- Elevation: 572 m (1,877 ft)

Population (2025-01-01)
  - Total: 560
  - Density: 14/km^{2} (35/sq mi)
- Time zone: UTC+1 (CET)
  - Summer (DST): UTC+2 (CEST)
- Website: Ayuntamiento de Valverde de Llerena

Valverde de Llerena is a municipality in the province of Badajoz, Extremadura, Spain. It has a population of 763 and an area of 41 km^{2}.

== Situation ==
It is situated in the vicinity of Ahillones toward Guadalcanal, close already to the edge of the Seville. It is a settlement in gentle slope on a hilly domain corresponding to the foothills of the Sierra Morena.

The city belongs to the commerce of Extremadura of Badajoz and the Judicial branch of Llerena.

== History ==
The current name of the population is attributed to its founder, Don Rodrigo de Valverde. However, throughout history has been known by other names: at the end of the 15th century was the nickname of Valverde de la Reina. Also called "Azuaga Valverde", by relying on this municipality jurisdictional area.

Valverde de Llerena Foundation took place on the year 1240, by Don Rodrigo Valverde, Knight of the Order of Santiago, Commander of Valez, who in the middle of the 13th century consolidated the occupation of the site by giving various privileges to those who settled there.

The new population went to the jurisdiction of the order of Santiago. In 1594, the population census of the provinces and parties of the Crown of Castile in the 16th century was part of the Order of Santiago de Leon and had 232 pecheros neighbors.

It was in 1559 when acquired for consideration and the title of villa by mercy of King Philip. In 1586, it was segregated definitely santiagueños domains, to be sold to Mariana de Córdova, Marchioness of Villanueva del Río, passing more than returns to the extensive domains of the House of Alba.

In the fall of the oldern times, the town was in the municipal in northeastern Extremadura. It was integrated in the judicial district of Llerena from 1834.

== Heritage ==
Catholic parish church under the invocation of La Purísima Concepción, in the Archdiocese of Mérida-Badajoz.

== See also ==
- List of municipalities in Badajoz
