= Battle of Usagre =

1811 battle during the Peninsular War

- Part of the Peninsular War
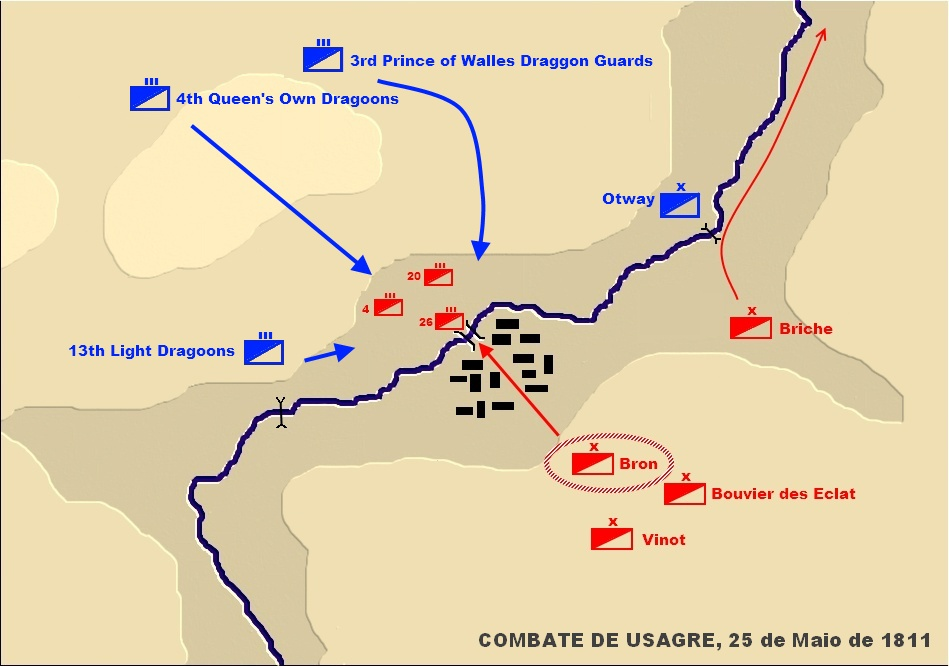
- Combat of Usagre
Date	25 May 1811
Location	Usagre, Spain 38.3449°N 6.1716°W
Result	Coalition victory

Belligerents
(First French Empire) French Empire	(United Kingdom of Great Britain and Ireland) British Empire; Portuguese Empire; Spanish Empire

Commanders and leaders
(First French Empire) Victor de Faÿ	(United Kingdom of Great Britain and Ireland) William Lumley

Strength
3,500	2,000; 6 guns

Casualties and losses
250 killed, wounded or captured	20 killed, wounded or captured

Peninsular War
Castile 1811–13
current battle

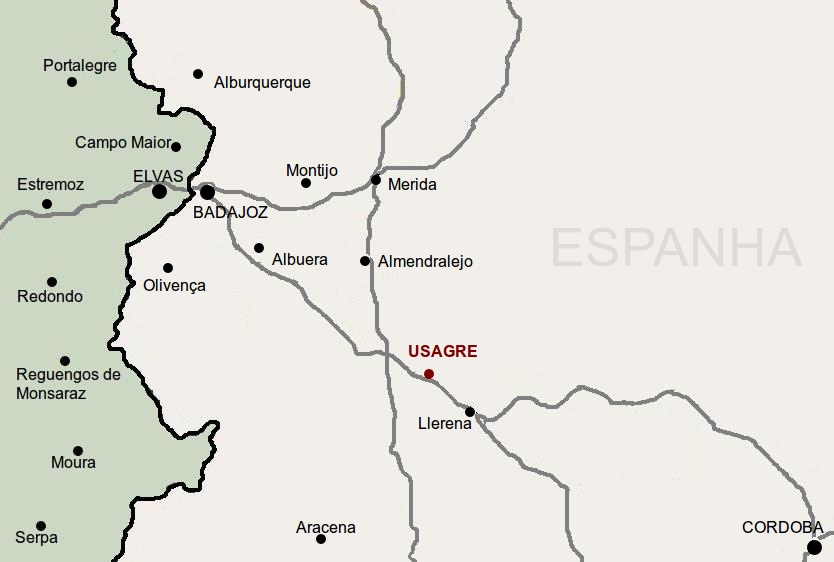
Location of Usagre

In the Battle of Usagre on 25 May 1811, Anglo-Allied cavalry commanded by Major-General William Lumley routed a French cavalry force led by Major-General Marie Victor Latour-Maubourg at the village of Usagre, Spain, in the Peninsular War.

Beforehand, Lumley explored the area; the British hid their forces behind the ridge where they cannot be seen, while the French found themselves in a disadvantageous position when they were caught crossing the river and unable to exploit their numerical superiority. With the river just behind those Frenchmen who had already crossed it, the British took advantage of the opportunity by launching an assault; this means that in case of any tactical failure on the French side, withdrawal will be problematic, whilst the bridge at Usagre led straight into a defile, only access through which was a very narrow passage.

== Background ==
A week after the very bloody Battle of Albuera, Marshal Nicolas Soult sent Latour-Maubourg's cavalry to discover the position of Marshal William Carr Beresford's Allied army. On 25 May, the French cavalry came upon a line of Portuguese cavalry vedettes on a ridge behind the village of Usagre. Lumley posted the bulk of his forces behind the ridge, out of sight.

== Forces ==
Lumley's force included the 980 troopers of Colonel George de Grey's brigade (3rd Prince of Wales Dragoon Guards, 4th Queen's Own Dragoons), and the 13th Light Dragoons under Lieutenant-Colonel Joseph Muter, the 1,000-sabre Portuguese cavalry under Colonel Loftus William Otway (1st and 7th Dragoons, with elements of the 5th and 8th) and the 300 Spanish troopers led by Penne Villemur, plus Lefebvre's Troop (Royal Horse Artillery).

Latour-Maubourg led two dragoon brigades under Brigadier-General Bron (4th, 20th and 26th Dragoons) and Brigadier-General Bouvier des Éclaz (14th, 17th and 27th Dragoons). He sent four regiments of light cavalry under Brigadier-General Briche on a wide flanking manoeuvre. The French had about 3,500 horsemen. Confident in his numerical superiority, Latour-Maubourg pressed ahead.

== Battle ==
Lumley ignored the French flanking force because he knew that they would not arrive in time. He let the 4th and 20th Dragoons of Bron's brigade pass through Usagre, cross the bridge and form up on the other side. As the 26th Dragoons began crossing the span, Lumley attacked. He brought up his cavalry and sent six British squadrons, supported by six Portuguese squadrons on their right, against the two deployed French regiments.

The French horsemen were defeated and thrown back on the 26th Dragoons, who were still jammed on the bridge. With the British cavalry all around them and their retreat blocked, the French dragoons were cut to pieces. Latour-Maubourg's only recourse was to dismount the first regiment of Bouvier des Eclat's brigade and use the dragoons to hold the houses near the bridge. At last, the remnants of Bron's regiments fought their way back, covered by carbine fire from the village.

== Results ==
The French lost 250 killed or wounded, plus 78 captured, mostly from the 4th and 20th Dragoons. The British only lost 20 troopers killed or wounded.

== See also ==
- Battle of Koljonvirta (1808), during the same (Napoleonic) period, where the numerically inferior Swedish army beat the Russian troops at the river crossing, inflicting heavier casualties on their opponent.

== Notes ==
Preceded by Battle of Albuera	Napoleonic Wars; Battle of Usagre	Succeeded by Battle of Saguntum
