= Peraleda del Zaucejo =

- Municipality
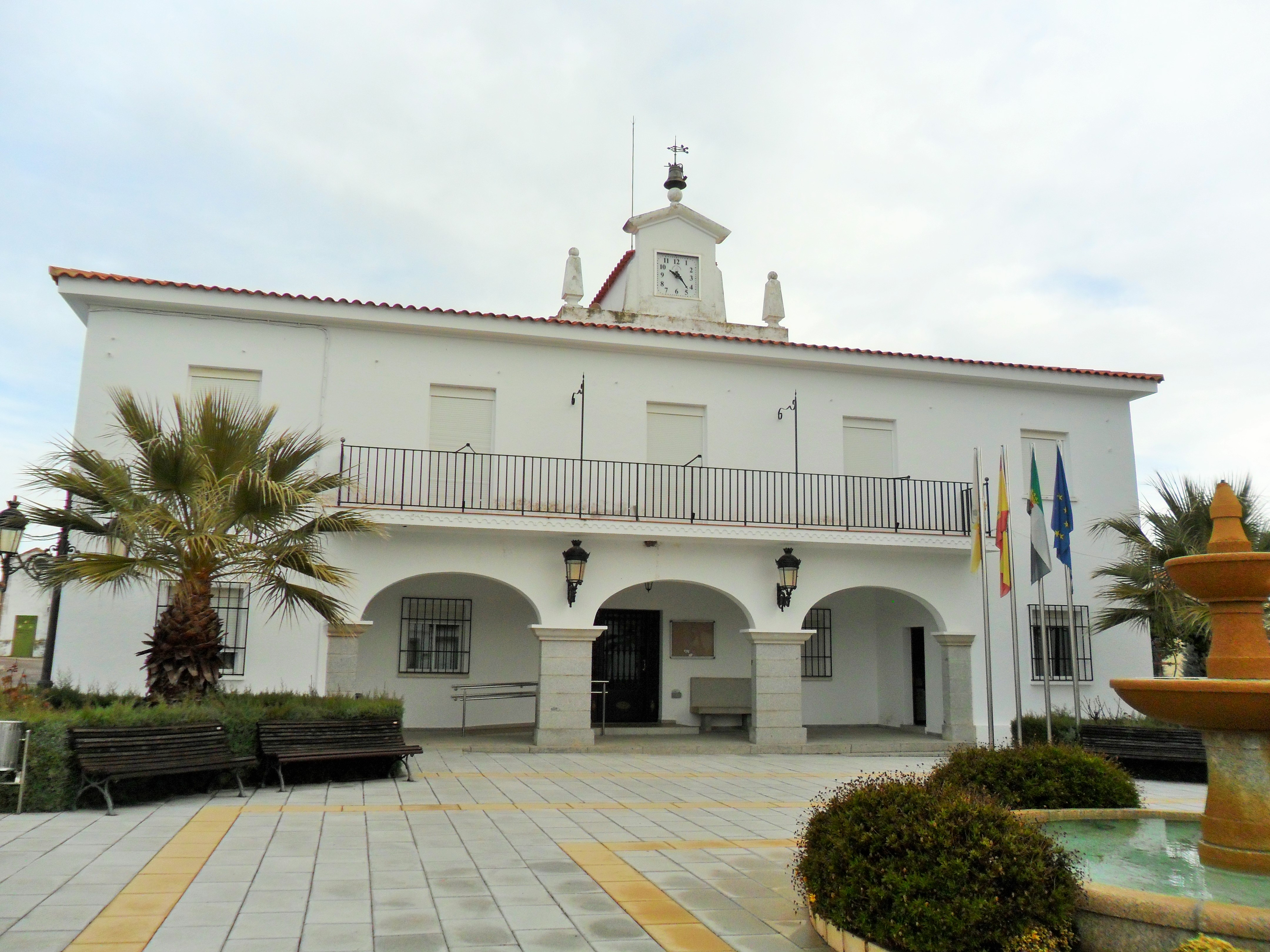
- Town hall

- Flag Coat of arms

- Location in Spain
- Coordinates: 38°28′20″N 5°33′30″W
- Country: Spain
- Autonomous community: Extremadura
- Province: Badajoz
- Comarca: Campiña Sur

Area
  - Total: 163.7 km^{2} (63.2 sq mi)
- Elevation: 541 m (1,775 ft)

Population (2025-01-01)
  - Total: 465
  - Density: 2.84/km^{2} (7.36/sq mi)
- Time zone: UTC+1 (CET)
  - Summer (DST): UTC+2 (CEST)

Peraleda del Zaucejo is a municipality in the province of Badajoz, Extremadura, Spain. According to the 2014 census, the municipality has a population of 562 inhabitants.

== See also ==
- List of municipalities in Badajoz
