= Llerena (surname) =

Llerena is a Spanish surname. Notable people with the surname include:

- Hernán Llerena (1928–2010), Peruvian cyclist
- Mario Llerena (1913–2006), Cuban revolutionary

== See also ==
- Llerena (disambiguation)
