= Miguel del Barco Gallego =

Spanish organist, composer, musician and teacher (born 1938)

Miguel del Barco Gallego (born January 18, 1938) is a Spanish organist, composer, musician, and teacher.

== Early life and education ==
Miguel del Barco Gallego was born on January 18, 1938, in Llerena, Spain. His mother gave him music theory lessons. Later he studied official organ and composition studies at the Madrid Royal Conservatory, eventually becoming a musician, organist, composer and teacher

== Career ==
He taught at the Conservatory of Music in Seville. In 1985 he composed the Himno de Extremadura (verde blanca y negra), with José Rodgríguez Pinilla, who wrote the lyrics of the anthem. In June 2006 he received the National Record Award from the Ministry of Culture.

== Distinctions and recognitions ==
- Medalla de Extremadura.
- Medalla de Oro de la Asamblea de Extremadura.
- Miembro de la Real Academia Extremeña de las Letras y las Artes.
- Insignia de Oro de la Diputación de Badajoz.
- Comendador de la Orden de Alfonso X el Sabio.
- Premio Hispanidad de Guadalupe.
- Hijo Predilecto de Llerena.
- Caballero Benefactor de Yuste y de Santa María de Guadalupe.
