= Valencia de las Torres =

- municipality
- Coat of arms
- Interactive map of Valencia de las Torres
- Coordinates: 38°24′N 6°00′W
- Country: Spain
- Autonomous community: Extremadura
- Province: Badajoz

Area
  - Total: 210 km^{2} (81 sq mi)
- Elevation: 520 m (1,710 ft)

Population (2025-01-01)
  - Total: 486
  - Density: 2.3/km^{2} (6.0/sq mi)
- Time zone: UTC+1 (CET)
  - Summer (DST): UTC+2 (CEST)

Valencia de las Torres is a municipality located in the province of Badajoz, Extremadura, Spain. According to the 2005 census (INE), the municipality has a population of 724 inhabitants.

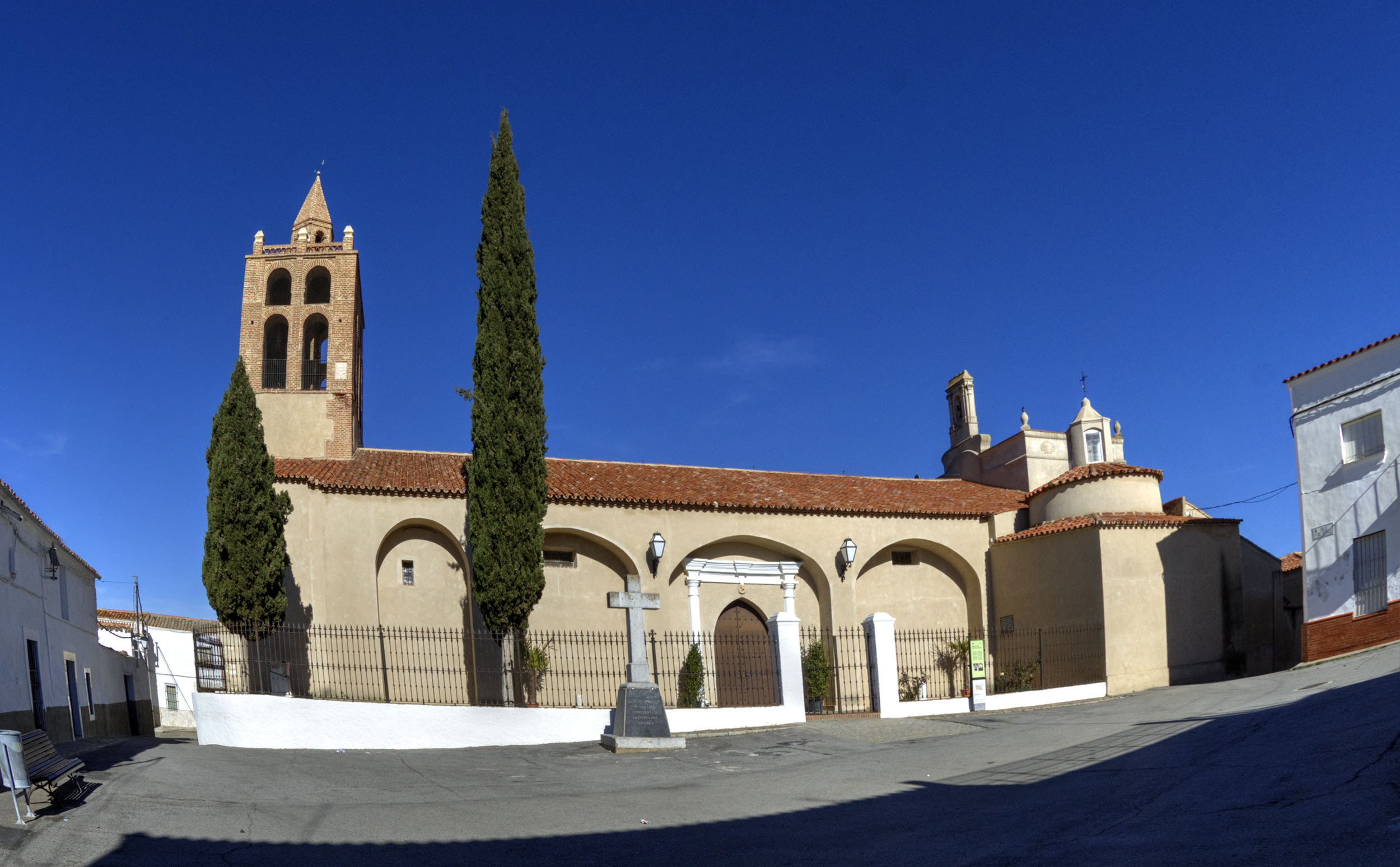
Parish Church of Valencia de las Torres, Badajoz

== See also ==
- List of municipalities in Badajoz
