= Reina, Badajoz =

Coordinates: 38°11′N 5°57′W

Reina
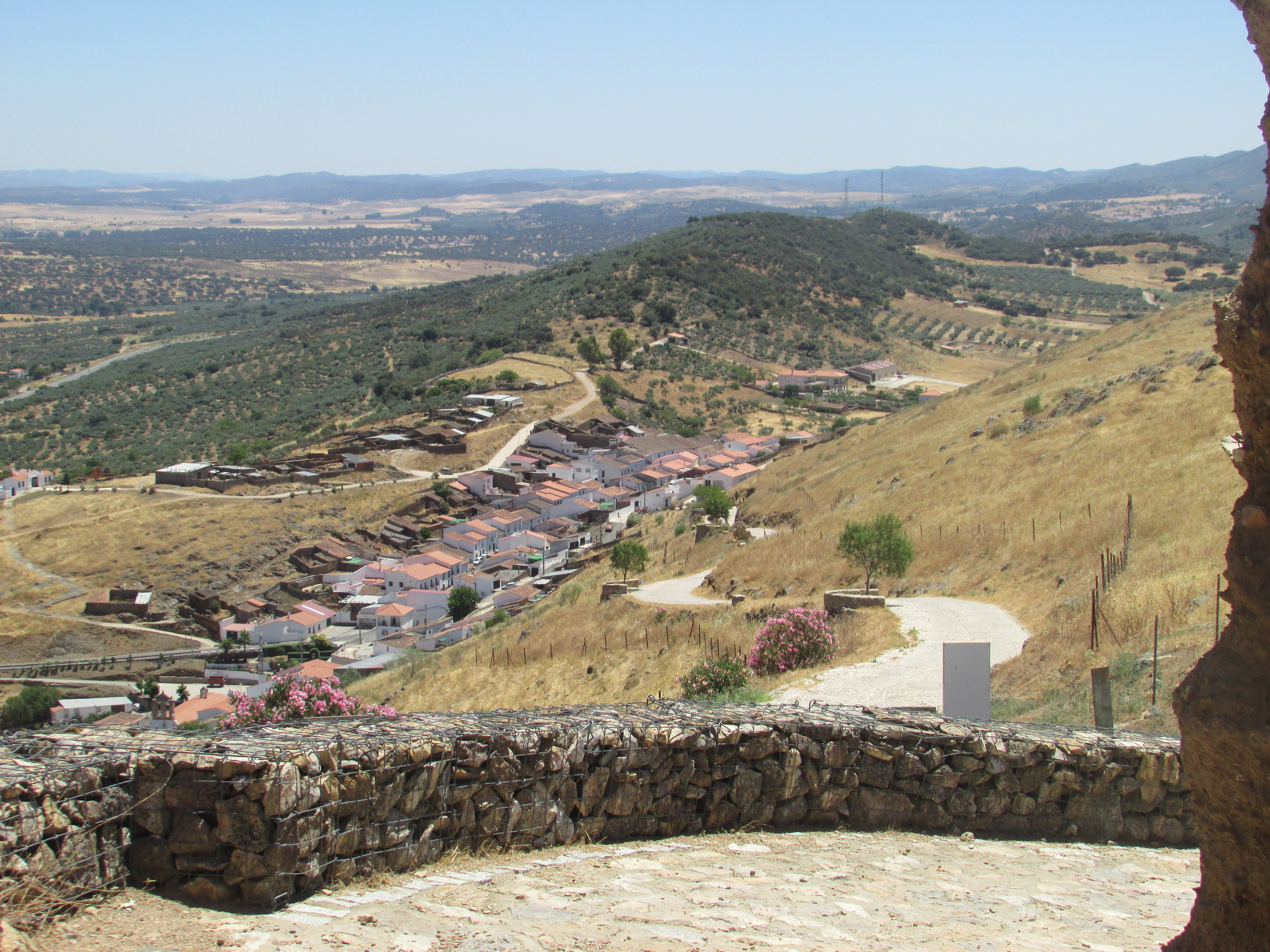
- Reina

- Coat of arms
- Interactive map of Reina
- Country: Spain
- Autonomous community: Extremadura
- Province: Badajoz
- Comarca: Campiña Sur

Government
  - Alcaldesa: Ceferina González Rubio

Area
  - Total: 64.7 km^{2} (25.0 sq mi)
- Elevation: 705 m (2,313 ft)

Population (2025-01-01)
  - Total: 144
- Time zone: UTC+1 (CET)
  - Summer (DST): UTC+2 (CEST)
- Website: Ayuntamiento de Reina

Reina is a Spanish municipality in the province of Badajoz, Extremadura. As of 2007, it had a population of 189 and consisted of an area of 64.7 km^{2} (25.0 sq mi).

== See also ==
- List of municipalities in Badajoz
