= Malcocinado =

- municipality
- Coat of arms

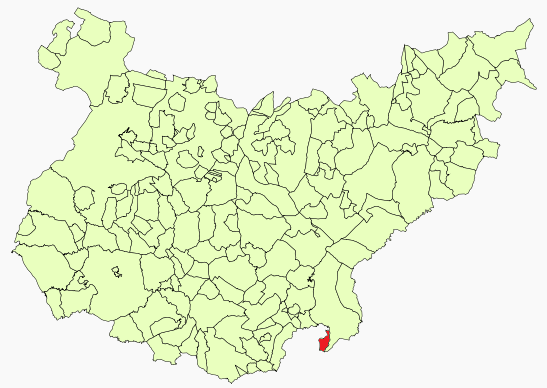
- Location in Badajoz

- Location of within Extremadura
- Coordinates: 38°7′34″N 5°42′47″W
- Country: Spain
- Autonomous community: Extremadura
- Province: Badajoz

Area
  - Total: 26.2 km^{2} (10.1 sq mi)
- Elevation: 601 m (1,972 ft)

Population (2025-01-01)
  - Total: 343
  - Density: 13.1/km^{2} (33.9/sq mi)
- Time zone: UTC+1 (CET)
  - Summer (DST): UTC+2 (CEST)

Malcocinado is a municipality located in the Badajoz Province, Extremadura, Spain. According to the 2005 census (INE), the municipality has a population of 486 inhabitants.

== Notable people ==
Valentín 'El Campesino' González González (1904 – 1983), famous Republican military commander during the Spanish Civil War

== See also ==
- List of municipalities in Badajoz
