= Trasierra =

- Municipality
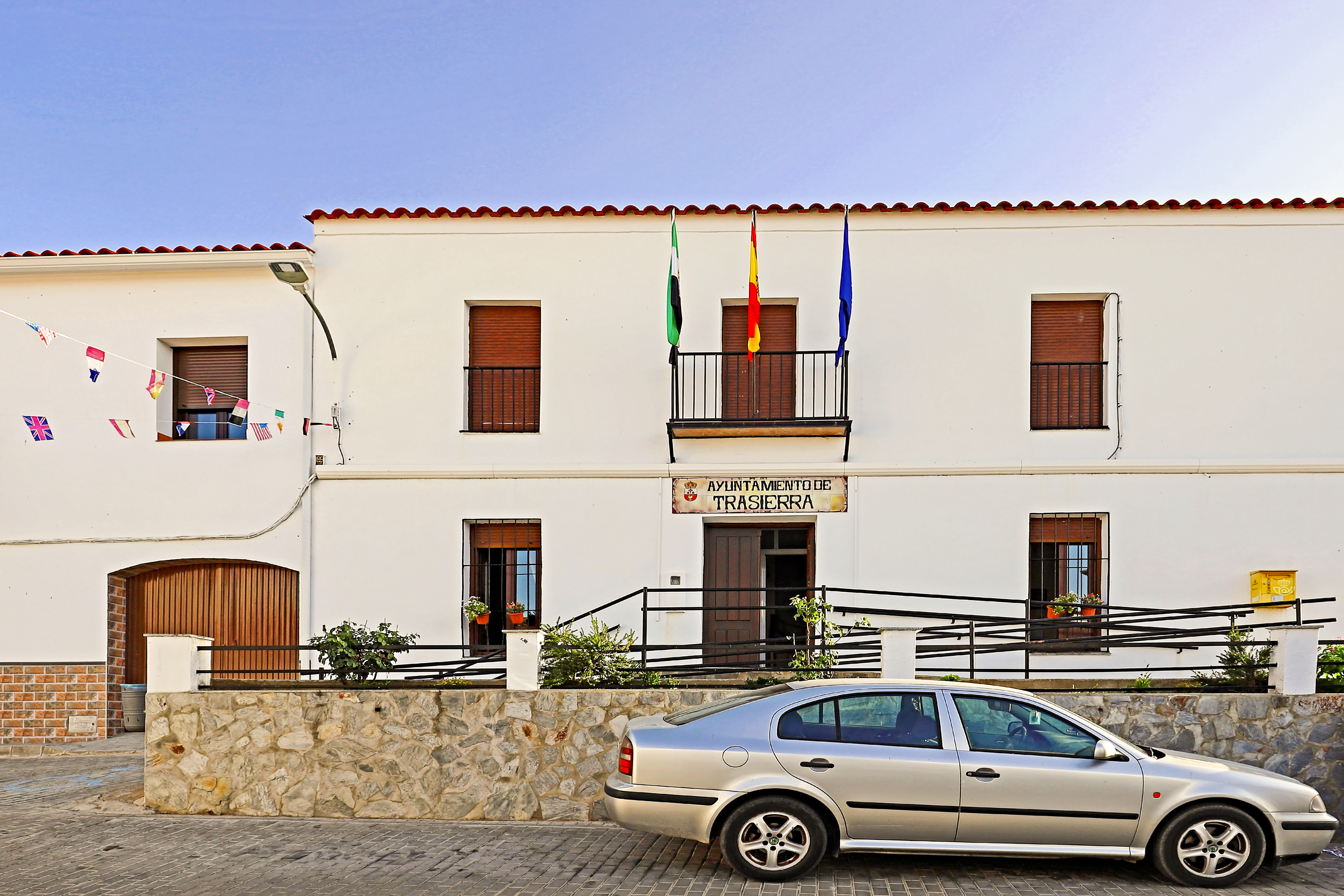
- Town hall

- Coat of arms

- Location in Spain
- Coordinates: 38°11′N 5°59′W
- Country: Spain
- Autonomous community: Extremadura
- Province: Badajoz
- Municipality: Trasierra

Area
  - Total: 58 km^{2} (22 sq mi)
- Elevation: 696 m (2,283 ft)

Population (2025-01-01)
  - Total: 590
  - Density: 10/km^{2} (26/sq mi)
- Time zone: UTC+1 (CET)
  - Summer (DST): UTC+2 (CEST)
- Website: www.trasierra.es

Trasierra is a municipality located in the province of Badajoz, Extremadura, Spain. According to the 2014 census, the municipality has a population of 659 inhabitants.

== Local celebrations ==
- Fiesta del Santísimo Cristo del Socorro or Fiesta de los Manoletes, 20 April.
- San Isidro Labrador, 15 May
- San Antonio de Padua, 13 June
- Fiestas Patronales. Santa Marta, 29 July.
- Fiesta de La Chaquetía, 1 November.

== See also ==
- List of municipalities in Badajoz
