= Puebla del Maestre =

Coordinates: 38°5′0″N 6°4′50″W

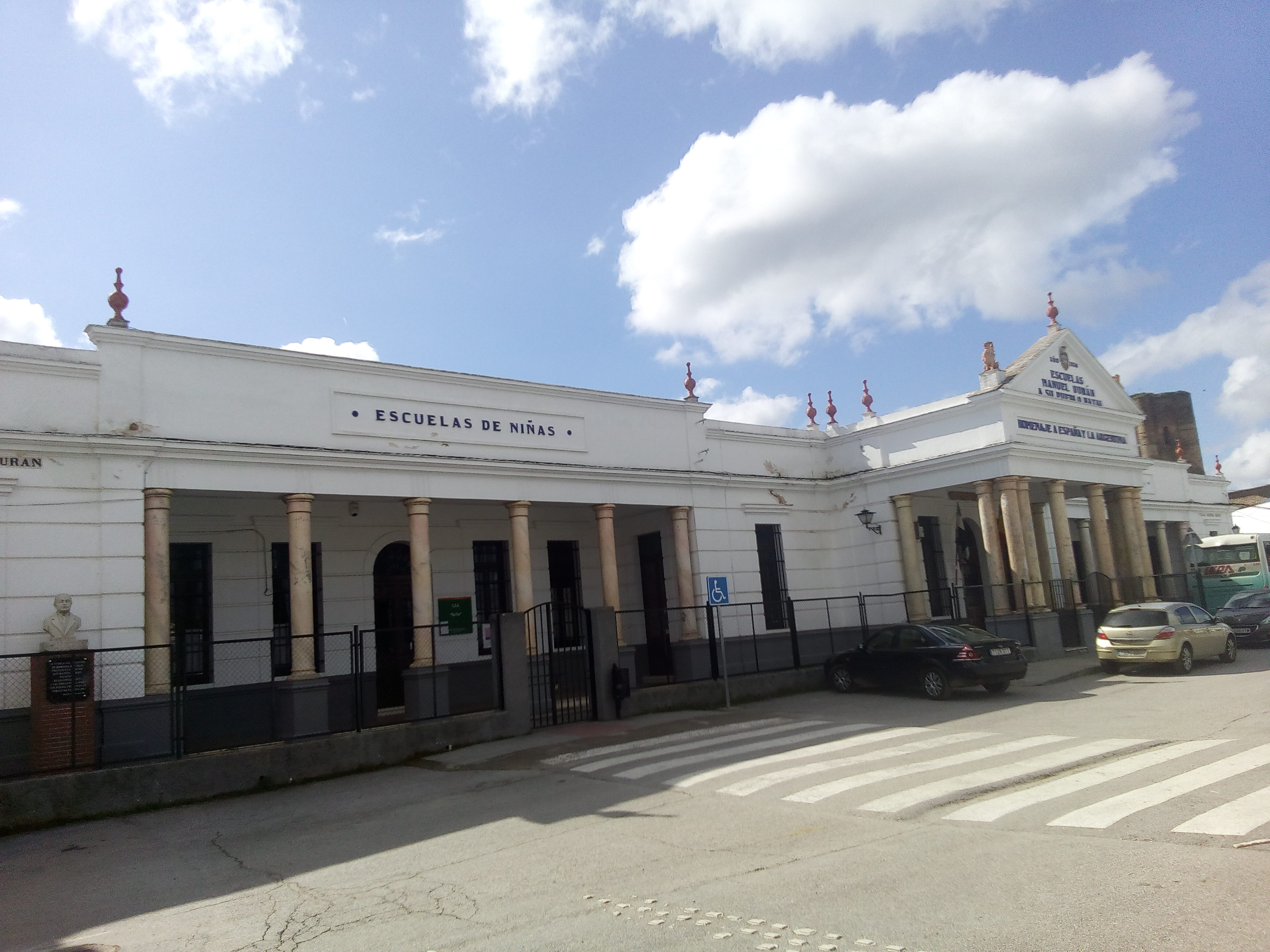
- View of Puebla del Maestre

- Coat of arms

- Location in Spain.
- Country: Spain
- Autonomous community: Cáceres

Area
  - Total: 79.2 km^{2} (30.6 sq mi)
- Elevation: 553 m (1,814 ft)

Population (2025-01-01)
  - Total: 653
  - Density: 8.24/km^{2} (21.4/sq mi)
- Time zone: UTC+1 (CET)
  - Summer (DST): UTC+2 (CEST)
- Website: www.puebladelmaestre.es

Puebla del Maestre is a municipality in the province of Badajoz, Extremadura, Spain. It has a population of 831 inhabitants and a total area of 79 km^{2} (31 sq mi).

== See also ==
- List of municipalities in Badajoz
