= Valle de la Serena =

Coordinates: 38°42′N 5°47′W

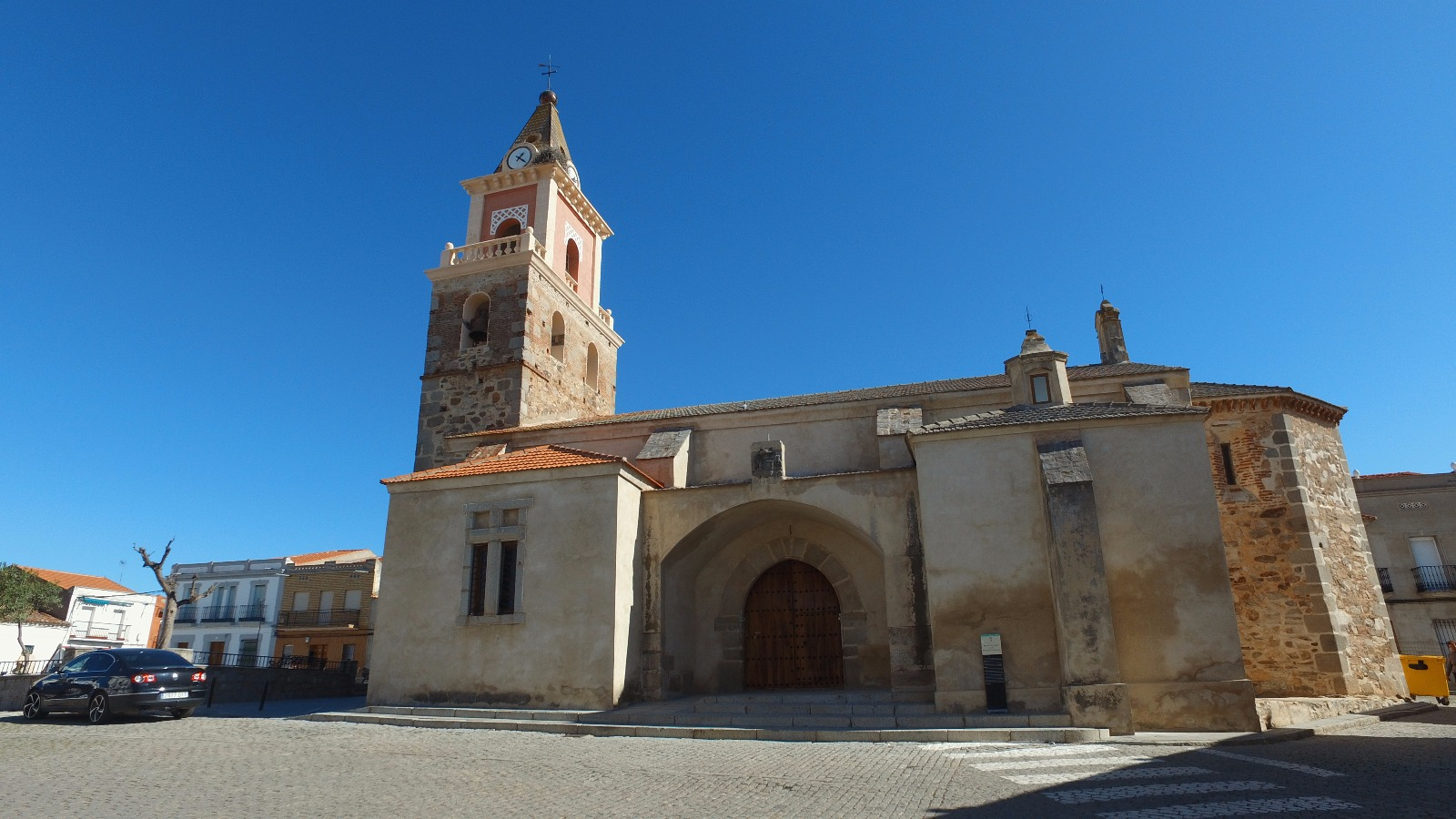

- Coat of arms
- Interactive map of Valle de la Serena
- Country: Spain
- Autonomous community: Extremadura
- Province: Badajoz
- Comarca: La Serena

Government
  - Alcalde: Martín Caballero Horrillo

Area
  - Total: 121.4 km^{2} (46.9 sq mi)
- Elevation: 423 m (1,388 ft)

Population (2025-01-01)
  - Total: 1,075
- Time zone: UTC+1 (CET)
  - Summer (DST): UTC+2 (CEST)
- Website: Ayuntamiento de Valle de la Serena

Valle de la Serena is a Spanish municipality in the province of Badajoz, Extremadura. It has a population of 1,457 (2007) and an area of 121.4 km^{2}.

== Notable people ==
- Juan Donoso Cortés (6 May 1809 – 3 May 1853) was a Spanish author, conservative and Catholic political theorist, and diplomat

== See also ==
- List of municipalities in Badajoz
