= Casas de Reina =

- Flag Coat of arms

- Location of Casas de Reina within Extremadura
- Coordinates: 38°12′8″N 5°58′11″W
- Country: Spain
- Autonomous community: Extremadura
- Province: Badajoz
- Municipality: Casas de Reina

Area
  - Total: 50 km^{2} (19 sq mi)
- Elevation: 635 m (2,083 ft)

Population (2025-01-01)
  - Total: 200
  - Density: 4.0/km^{2} (10/sq mi)
- Time zone: UTC+1 (CET)
  - Summer (DST): UTC+2 (CEST)
- Website: http://www.casasdereina.com Ayuntamiento de Casas de Reina

Casas de Reina is a municipality located in the province of Badajoz, Extremadura, Spain. According to the 2005 census (INE), the municipality has a population of 193 inhabitants.

== See also ==
- List of municipalities in Badajoz
