= Azuaga =

- Municipality
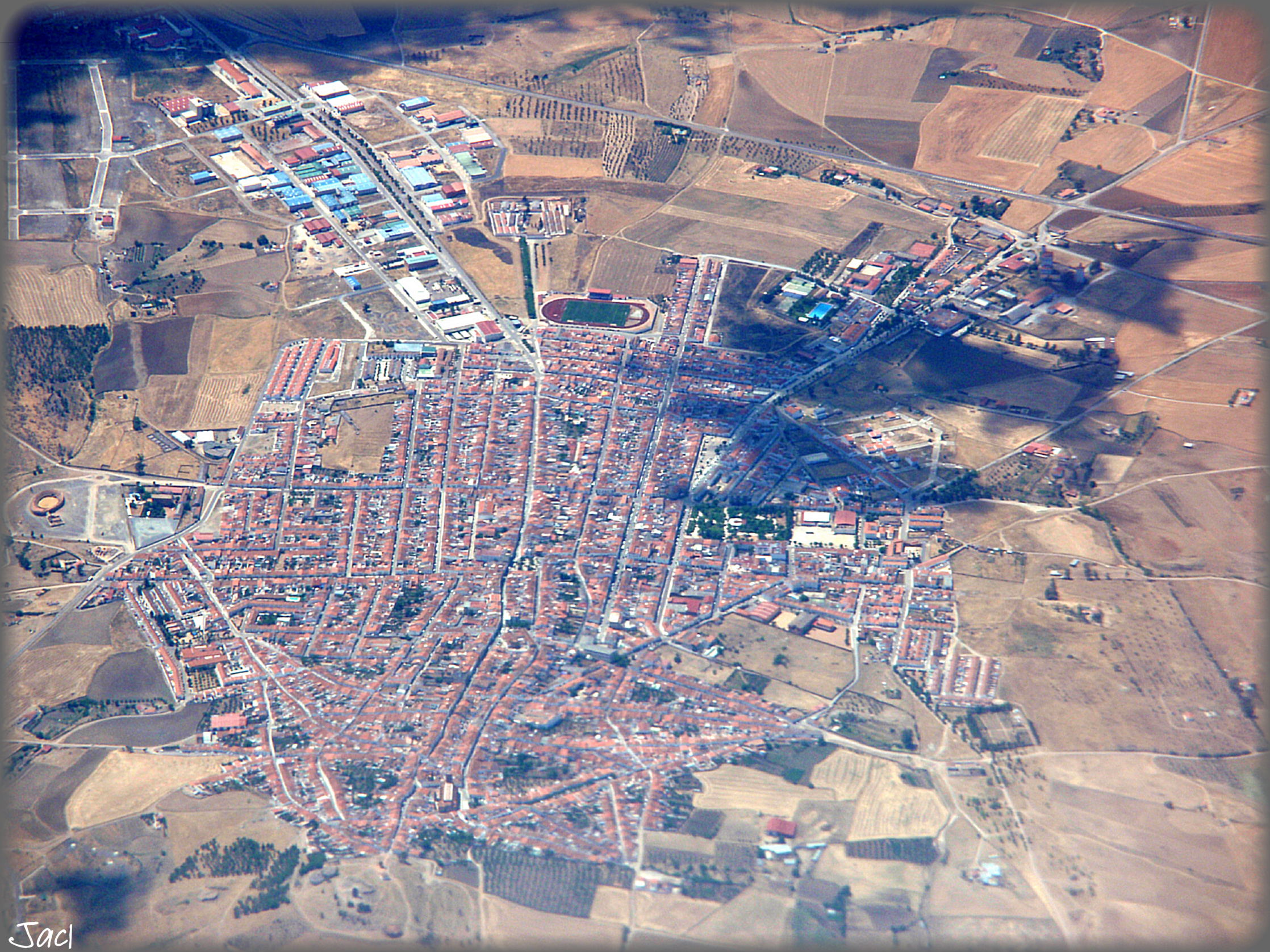

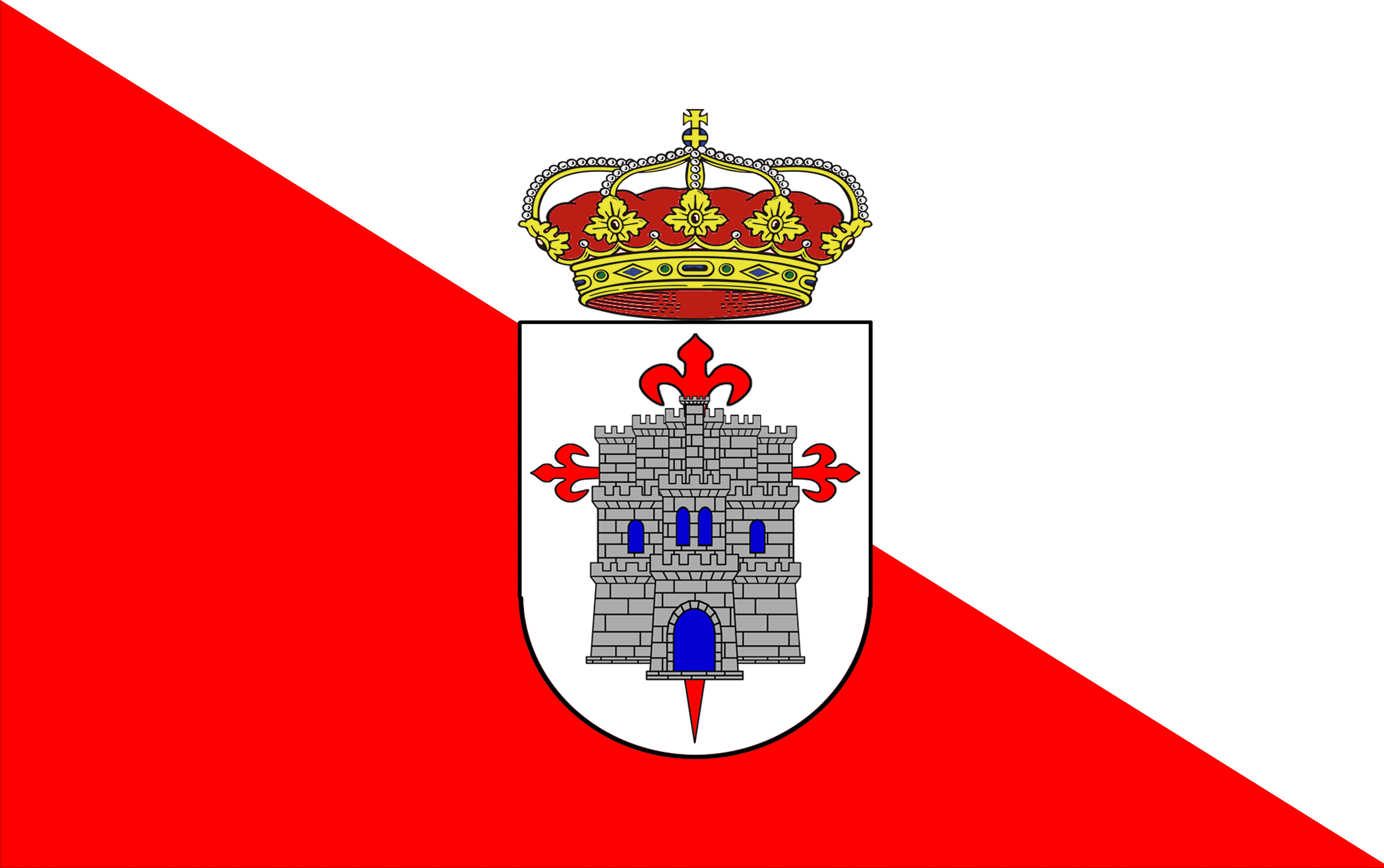
- Flag Coat of arms

- Location of Azuaga within Extremadura
- Coordinates: 38°15′32″N 5°40′40″W
- Country: Spain
- Autonomous community: Extremadura
- Province: Badajoz
- Comarca: Campiña Sur
- Judicial district: Llerena
- Founded: 1st century

Government
  - Mayor: María Natividad Fuentes del Puerto (2007) (PP)

Area
  - Total: 497.9 km^{2} (192.2 sq mi)
- Elevation: 593 m (1,946 ft)

Population (2025-01-01)
  - Total: 7,587
  - Density: 15.24/km^{2} (39.47/sq mi)
- Demonyms: Azuagueños, Arsenses
- Time zone: UTC+1 (CET)
  - Summer (DST): UTC+2 (CEST)
- Postal code: 06920
- Website: Official website

Azuaga (Spanish: [aˈθwaɣa]) is a town located in the province of Badajoz in southern Extremadura, bordering the Andalusian provinces of Seville and Córdoba in Spain. Azuga is 140 km from Badajoz, 125 km from Córdoba, and 140 km from Seville, in the foothills of Sierra Morena in the frontier region of Campiña Sur.

With a surface area of 498 km^{2}, Azuaga is the fourth largest municipality by area in the province of Badajoz and includes the village of the Cardenchosa. The inhabitants in 2010 were 8303.

== History ==
=== Ancient era ===
Azuaga has archeological remains from the Megalithic era, the Copper Age, Bronze Age, and also from the Orientalizing Period.

In the period of the Roman Empire, Azuaga was part of the province of Lusitania, known variously as Municipium Flavium Ugultuniacum, Municipium Iulium V, or Julia Flavia. Its inhabitants were of the Galeria tribe (Latin tribu Galeria). Local remains from the era include two stone tablets with inscriptions.

There are few remains from the Visigothic era.

=== Middle Ages ===
When Spain fell into Moorish hands, Azuaga underwent a period of growth. Among the historical evidence of Moorish Azuaga, the Muslim geographer and traveler Al Idrisi mentions the settlement in the 12th century, alluding to it as a hilltop fort - (حِصْن زُوَاغَة - HiSn Zuwāghah). This is the first writing that mentions Azuaga by name. It would appear that at that time the people of Azuaga were of the Berber tribe Al-Zuwaga, hence the name. Azuaga still has a surviving portion of its 11th-century castle.

In 1236 Azuaga was conquered by the Christian kingdoms of Castile, during the reign of Ferdinand III, by the Order of Santiago, directed at that time by Pelay Pérez Correa. The Christian captured the castle and constructed the new Torre del Homenaje ("Tower of Homage"), the best conserved portion of the castle today.

In 1477, in the Ermita (Hermitage) de San Sebastián (later the Convento de La Merced [Mercy], then the Ermita de La Merced), the Order de Santiago held a general chapter meeting and selected Don Alonso de Cárdenas as its new master.

=== Modern era ===
In the first census of Extremadura in 1551, Azuaga was the largest population center in Extremadura. In 18th century censuses, Azuaga appears as one of the principal towns of the region. It dominated the region in artisanal and manufacturing activity, most prominently in textiles and dyes.

Azuagueños artist Juan del Castillo (1585–1658) did his major work in Seville, where he was the maestro of an atelier. His brother Agustín del Castillo (1590–1626) painted in Córdoba.

In the 16th century, two different clerics were known by the same name, Fray Pedro de Azuaga. One was an important Franciscan theorist, permanent counsellor to Philip II. The other, active in the last third of the century rose steadily through the ecclesiastical ranks, ultimately becoming Bishop of Chile in 1596.

During the colonial era, Azuaga ranked seventh in Extremadura in the number of people who went to the Americas. This is more significant than it might at first sound, because Extremadura was a major force in the conquest of the Americas.

In the nineteenth century and the early twentieth century, Azuaga was more or less eclipsed. Between 1920 and 1960, Azuaga experienced major activity in mining lead and (to a lesser degree) silver, which brought renewed prosperity to the region, fluctuating between 16,000 and 18,000 inhabitants, but after that the population fell off rapidly as workers migrated elsewhere, nearly half of the town's population departing. An identifiable group of azuagueños emigrated to Sant Boi de Llobregat (Barcelona).

== See also ==
- List of municipalities in Badajoz
