= Joseph Muter =

British Army officer

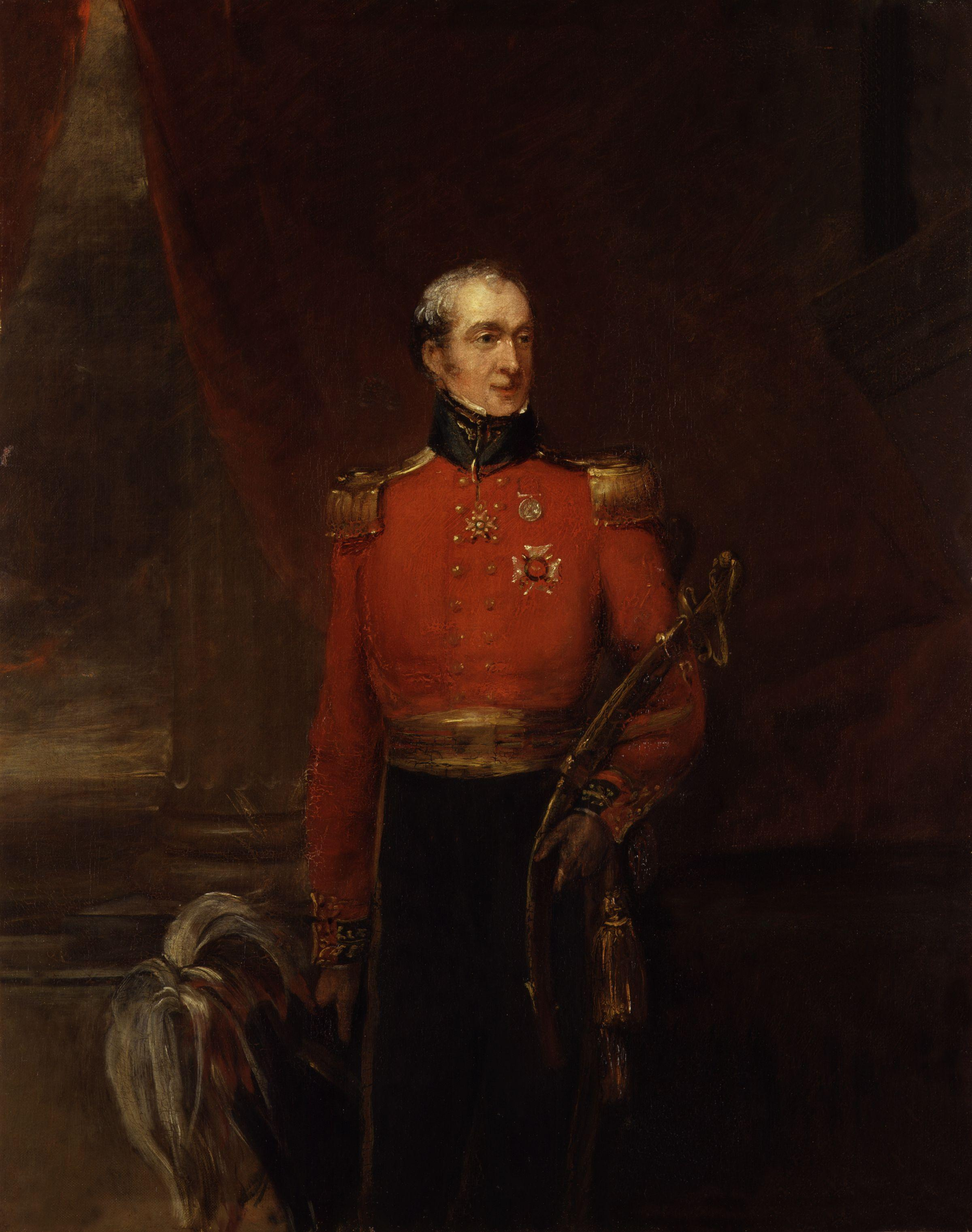
Portrait by William Salter

Sir Joseph Muter CB KCH FRSE (1780 – 23 October 1840) was a British Army officer who fought in the Peninsular War and led the Inniskilling Dragoons at the Battle of Waterloo on 18 June 1815. In 1816, following the inheritance of the Kirkside estate from his aunt, Miss Straton, he changed his name to Joseph Straton.

== Early life and career ==
Born the youngest son of William Muter of Annfield, Fifeshire in and his wife, Janet Straton of Kirkside near Montrose in Kincardineshire, he was educated at the University of Edinburgh where his classmates included James Abercromby, later Speaker of the House of Commons.

Muter joined the British Army as a cornet in the 2nd Dragoon Guards in December 1794. He was made a lieutenant in December 1795. On 5 September 1801 he was promoted from captain to major by purchase in the 13th Light Dragoons. In the year 1804/05 he spent a year studying at the Royal Military College, High Wycombe. On leaving he joined the Duke of Gloucester's staff.

In May 1808 he was created a lieutenant colonel and joined the 23rd Light Dragoons. He later saw service in the Peninsular War, back with the 13th Light Dragoons and was present at the battles of Campo Mayor, Albuera Usagre Arroyo de Molinos and Alba de Tormes.

In June 1814 he was promoted to full colonel.

== Waterloo ==
At the Battle of Waterloo Muter commanded the 6th Inniskilling (Irish) Regiment of Dragoons as part of the Union Brigade.

During the battle, in response to the French Infantry assault on Wellington's left centre, the Union Brigade moved forward. Unobserved until late in their advance, they caught the French by surprise and took around 1,000 prisoners, despite the two British heavy cavalry brigades losing half their numbers at the hands of the French lancers and cuirassiers.

Following the loss in battle of Major-General Sir William Ponsonby command of the 2nd Union Cavalry Brigade devolved upon Muter.

At around 6pm, after La Haye Sainte farm had fallen to the French, Muter was struck by a musket ball in the right wrist. The injury later became infected due to pieces of glove entering his body, with pus oozing from the wound. With treatment he subsequently recovered without the need for amputation. His role in the battalion was filled by Colonel Clifton after his removal from the battlefield.

After Waterloo he was awarded the Russian Order of St. Vladimir and made a Companion of the Bath (CB).

== Later life ==
In 1816 he inherited considerable estates in Montrose and was thereafter known as Joseph Straton.

He served in Ireland in 1819. In 1821, during a period in Edinburgh, he was elected a Fellow of the Royal Society of Edinburgh, his proposer being Sir David Brewster. He presented a lecture to the Society on the "Monuments of Thebes". He was also a member of the Bannatyne Club in Edinburgh. He was promoted to major general in 1825 and lieutenant general in 1838.

He was made colonel of the 8th Light Dragoons on 24 August 1839 and colonel of the 6th Inniskilling (Irish) Regiment of Dragoons on 30 April 1840. Some time around 1816 he changed his surname to Straton after inheriting a property belonging to his aunt in Kirkside, 3 miles (4.8 km) north of Montrose in Scotland.

He retired due to ill health in the summer of 1840 and died in October 1840. Having no children, his estates went to his nephew, Joseph Muter, who also renamed himself (to Joseph Muter Straton). Muter left a legacy of around £70,000 (about £6.2 million at 2015 values) to the University of Edinburgh. He was later described as one of the greatest benefactors of the university.

== Death ==
Muter died at Park Street off Grosvenor Square in London on 23 October 1840 at the age of 63 and is buried in the family plot in Nether Kirkyard, St Cyrus, near Montrose, where there is monument with a dedication to him.

== Artistic recognition ==
His portrait (as Sir Joseph Straton) by William Salter is held at the National Portrait Gallery, London.
