= Higuera de la Serena =

- Municipality
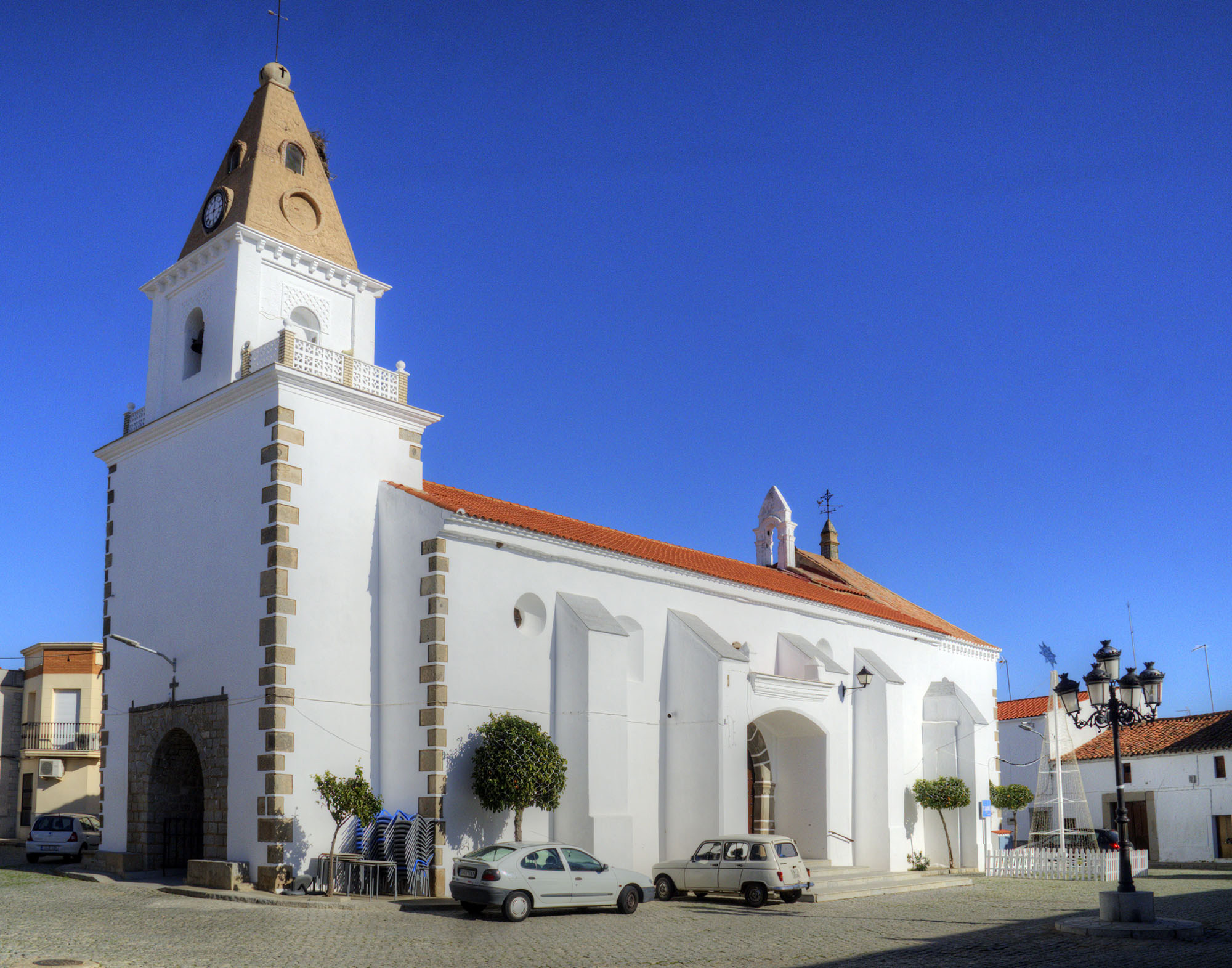

- Flag Coat of arms

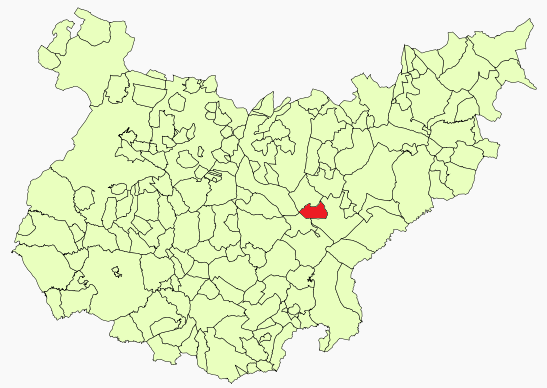
- Location in Badajoz

- Location of Higuera de la Serena within Extremadura
- Coordinates: 38°38′42″N 5°44′29″W
- Country: Spain
- Autonomous community: Extremadura
- Province: Badajoz
- Comarca: La Serena

Government
  - Mayor: Serafín Domínguez Murillo (Spanish Socialist Workers' Party of Extremadura)

Area
  - Total: 71.1 km^{2} (27.5 sq mi)
- Elevation: 473 m (1,552 ft)

Population (2025-01-01)
  - Total: 881
  - Density: 12.4/km^{2} (32.1/sq mi)
- Time zone: UTC+1 (CET)
  - Summer (DST): UTC+2 (CEST)

Higuera de la Serena is a municipality in the province of Badajoz, Extremadura, Spain. It has a population of 943 and an area of 71.1 km^{2}.

== See also ==
- List of municipalities in Badajoz
