= Oliva de Mérida =

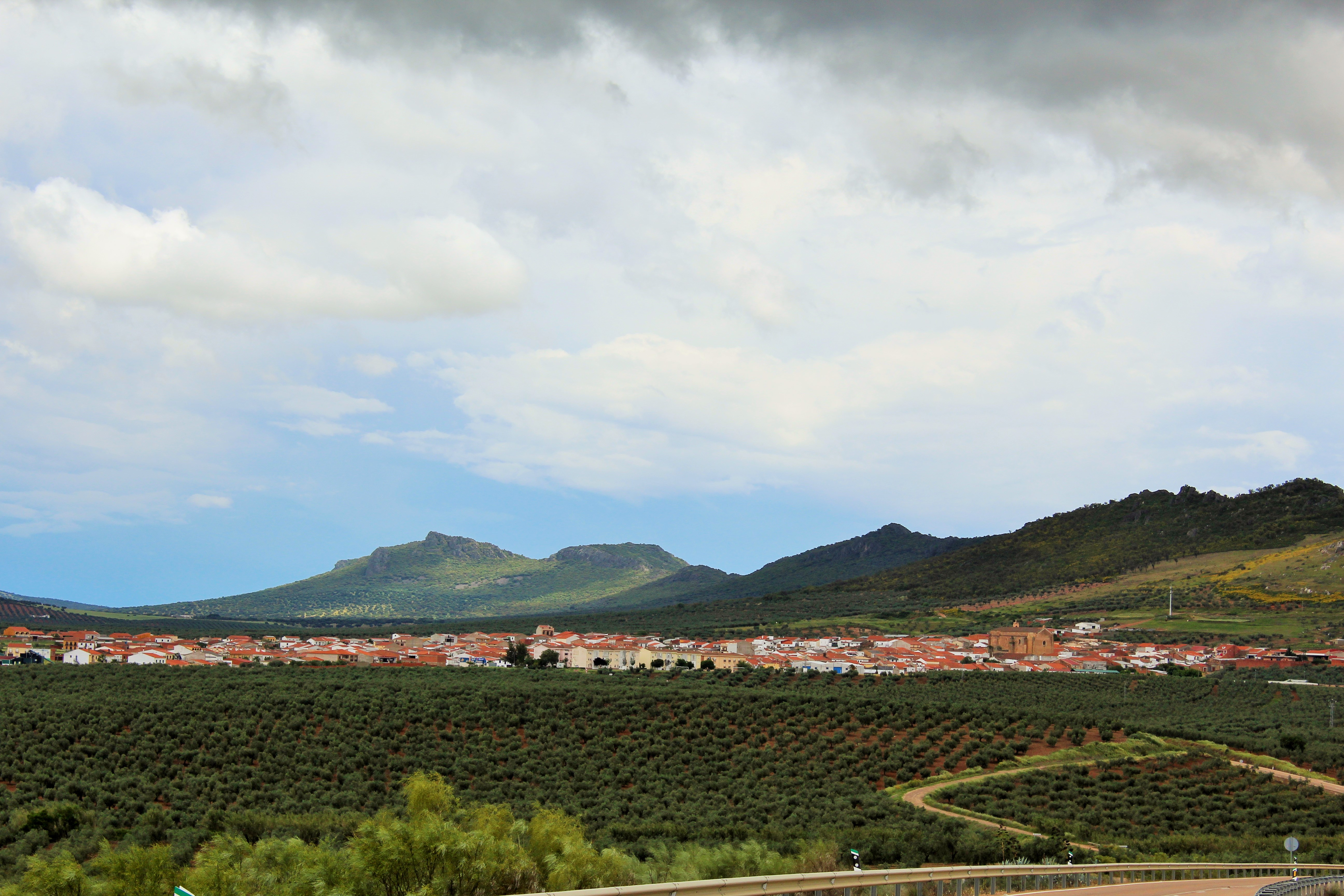

- Coat of arms

- Location of Oliva de Mérida within Extremadura
- Coordinates: 38°47′24″N 6°7′28″W
- Country: Spain
- Autonomous community: Extremadura
- Province: Badajoz
- Municipality: Oliva de Mérida

Area
  - Total: 254.5 km^{2} (98.3 sq mi)
- Elevation: 332 m (1,089 ft)

Population (2025-01-01)
  - Total: 1,660
  - Density: 6.52/km^{2} (16.9/sq mi)
- Time zone: UTC+1 (CET)
  - Summer (DST): UTC+2 (CEST)

Oliva de Mérida is a municipality located in the province of Badajoz, Extremadura, Spain. According to the 2005 census (INE), the municipality has a population of 1888 inhabitants.

== See also ==
- List of municipalities in Badajoz
