= Fuente del Arco =

- Coat of arms

- Location of Fuente del Arco within Extremadura
- Coordinates: 38°9′9″N 5°53′48″W
- Country: Spain
- Autonomous community: Extremadura
- Province: Badajoz
- Municipality: Fuente del Arco

Area
  - Total: 115 km^{2} (44 sq mi)
- Elevation: 703 m (2,306 ft)

Population (2025-01-01)
  - Total: 648
  - Density: 5.63/km^{2} (14.6/sq mi)
- Time zone: UTC+1 (CET)
  - Summer (DST): UTC+2 (CEST)

Fuente del Arco is a municipality located in the province of Badajoz, Extremadura, Spain. According to the 2005 census (INE), the municipality has a population of 754 inhabitants.

== History ==
At the end of the 19th century, mining production boomed in the Fuente del Arco area due to the activities carried out at the La Jayona mine, which led to significant economic and population growth.

In parallel with the economic and mining development, the railway also reached the municipality at the end of the 19th century. In 1885, the Mérida-Los Rosales line, built by the MZA company, entered service. The railroad had a station in Fuente del Arco, serving both passengers and freight. Ten years later (1895), another railway line was opened in the area: the Peñarroya-Fuente del Arco narrow-gauge railway, built by the Sociedad Minera y Metalúrgica de Peñarroya. This second route also had its own station, located next to the MZA facilities and railway line.

During the second half of the 20th century, mining and railway activity declined, resulting in a significant drop in the population of Fuente del Arco.

== See also ==
- List of municipalities in Badajoz

== Bibliography ==
- Wais, Francisco (1974). Historia de los Ferrocarriles Españoles (in Spanish). Madrid: Editora Nacional.
