= Higuera de Llerena =

- municipality
- Coat of arms

- Location of Higuera de Llerena within Extremadura
- Coordinates: 38°22′38″N 5°59′58″W
- Country: Spain
- Autonomous community: Extremadura
- Province: Badajoz

Area
  - Total: 113.4 km^{2} (43.8 sq mi)
- Elevation: 552 m (1,811 ft)

Population (2025-01-01)
  - Total: 343
  - Density: 3.02/km^{2} (7.83/sq mi)
- Time zone: UTC+1 (CET)
  - Summer (DST): UTC+2 (CEST)

Higuera de Llerena is a municipality located in the province of Badajoz, Extremadura, Spain. According to the 2005 census (INE), the municipality has a population of 392 inhabitants.

== History ==
In 1594, the census population of the provinces, and parties of the Crown of Castile of the 16th century were part of the state Lion of the Order of Santiago. It was a village of Llerena, with Cantalgayo and Maguilla.

=== Consolidation ===
In the fall of the Ancient Regime of the town, then known as Higuera, constitutes township in the region of Extremadura. From 1834, it became part of the judiciary party of Llerena. In the census of 1842 counted 66 households and 275 residents.

== Tourism ==
=== Monuments and attractions ===
- Church Our Lady of the Valley. (16th century)
- Of the Calvary Chapel of Christ.
- Ermita de San Isidro. In the hamlet of Rubiales. Recently restored by the Ministry of Development.
- Archaeological site of Mesilla, yet to be excavated.

=== Local events ===
- Feast of San Isidro (May 15). In the hamlet of Los Rubiales
- Migrant Party (August)
- Virgin Our Lady of the Valley (festival, September 8)

== See also ==
- List of municipalities in Badajoz
