= Berlanga, Badajoz =

Berlanga
- Location of Berlanga within Extremadura
- Coordinates: 38°16′58″N 5°49′45″W
- Country: Spain
- Autonomous community: Extremadura
- Province: Badajoz
- Comarca: Campiña Sur

Government
  - Alcalde: José Vera Madrid

Area
  - Total: 127.8 km^{2} (49.3 sq mi)
- Elevation: 573 m (1,880 ft)

Population (2025-01-01)
  - Total: 2,175
- Time zone: UTC+1 (CET)
  - Summer (DST): UTC+2 (CEST)
- Website: Ayuntamiento de Berlanga

Berlanga (Spanish pronunciation: [beɾˈlaŋɡa]) is a Spanish municipality in the province of Badajoz, Extremadura. It has a population of 2,546 (2007) and an area of 127.8 km^{2}.

== See also ==
- List of municipalities in Badajoz
