= Llerena, Badajoz =

Llerena
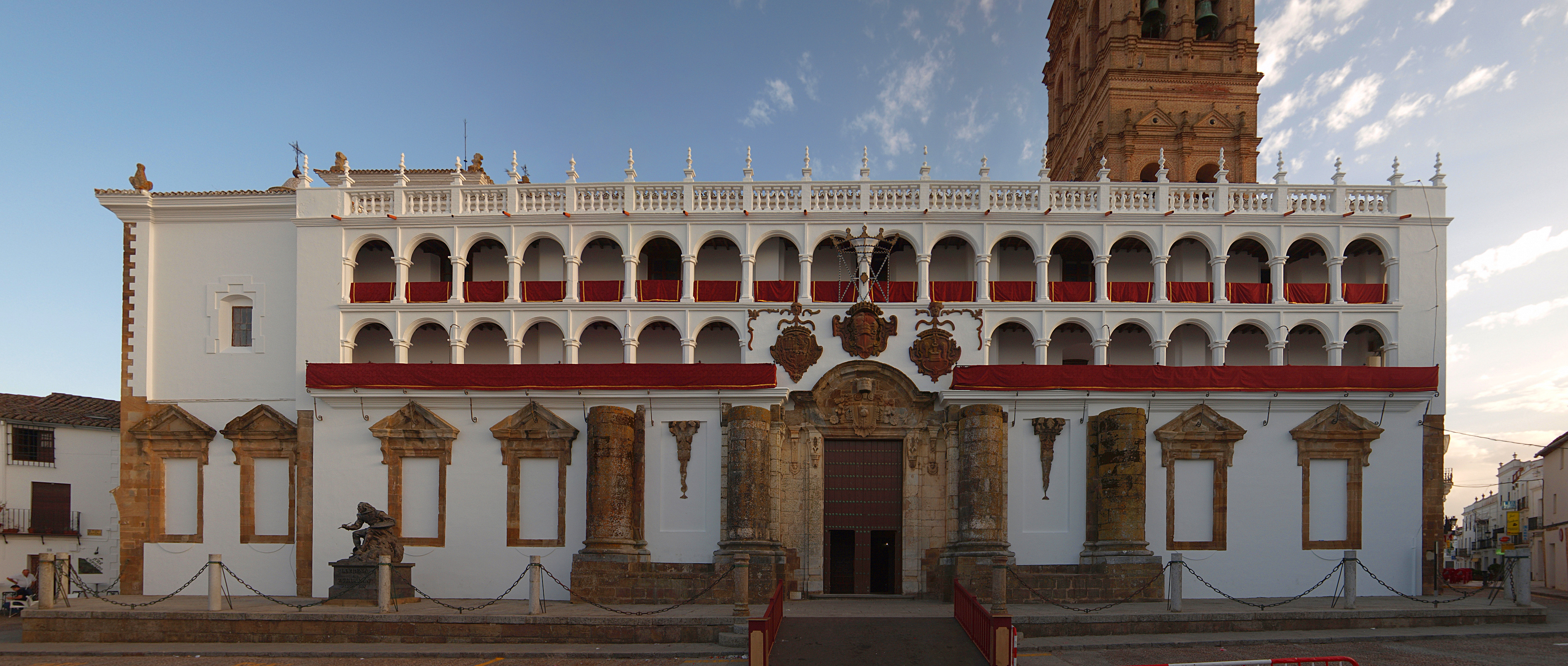
- Church of Nuestra Señora de la Granada

- Location within Extremadura Location within Spain
- Coordinates: 38°14′21″N 6°01′07″W
- Country: Spain
- Autonomous community: Extremadura
- Province: Badajoz
- Municipality: Llerena

Government
  - Alcalde: Juana Moreno (PSOE)

Area
  - Total: 162.7 km^{2} (62.8 sq mi)
- Elevation: 641 m (2,103 ft)

Population (2025-01-01)
  - Total: 5,642
  - Density: 34.68/km^{2} (89.81/sq mi)
- Time zone: UTC+1 (CET)
  - Summer (DST): UTC+2 (CEST)
- Website: http://llerena.org

Llerena is a municipality located in the province of Badajoz, Extremadura, Spain. According to the 2007 census (INE), the municipality had a population of 5,995 inhabitants. Llerena, a town that declared itself a Historical Artistic gathering on December 29, 1966, is located in southwestern Spain. The head of the judicial and economic center of the region of the country of the same name, it is equidistant from 20 municipalities, and sits at the confluence of the District 432 and 413 National Roads.

== History ==
=== Arab period ===
In the time of the Arabs it was called Ellerina, a place contested between Arabs and Christians. It was definitively occupied in the year 1243 by Pelayo Pérez Correa, master of the Order of Santiago, to whom Ferdinand III of Castile had entrusted the reconquest of Sierra Morena.

=== Order of Santiago ===
The settlement was given to the Order of Santiago, to provide for its defense and resettlement. The masters of the order granted Fueros in 1297.

The tradition emerged that the masters of the order used Llerena as their temporal residence. The most noteworthy masters who resided there were:

- The prince Don Fadrique (1342–1358), half-brother of King Peter I of Castile.
- Don Pedro Fernández Cabeza de Vaca (1382–1387)
- Don Enrique García Fernández of Villagarcía (1385–1387)
- Lorenzo Suárez de Figueroa (1387–1409), master buried in the Church of our Lady of Grenada
- Don Alonso de Cárdenas (1480–1493), last of the masters of the Order of Santiago. His sepulchre is also in the city.

Llerena was the habitual residence of the Masters of the Order of Santiago, and this fact favored the city in the 15th century, when it became capital of the Priory of the Hostal San Marcos de León. For this reason it was the most important center of the territory, which until then had been Reina. So much was its increase in importance that it became the most important administrative center of the Leon province of the order of Santiago in Extremadura, the headquarters of the Maestral order table, and the principal town of the more than 30 towns governed from Llerena and dependent upon the Prior of the Order of San Marcos in León.

In the year 1340, King Alfonso XI of Castile presided over the Cortes in Llerena. In 1383, Pedro Fernández celebrated the General Chapter of the Order of Santiago in Llerena, with the assistance of all of the Order's commanders.

The Master of the Order Lorenzo Suárez de Figueroa received the license to hold the San Mateo fair on September 21, built the chapel of the Trinity in the Church of Granada, built the bastimentos, and finished the building designed to be the Casa Maestral or the convent of Santa Elena.

Enrique García Fernández of Villagarcía built the castle in the neighboring town of Villagarcía de la Torre, and became the patron of the chancel of the Church of Santa Maria, and decided to be buried in it.

Alonso de Cárdenas built the Church of Santiago on the site occupied by the shrine of Saint Peter, and gave to the walled enclosure some of the most important gates of the city.

Having once been a Muslim territory, its reconquest produced a repopulation by Leonese, Basque and Cantabrian families. But an important core Jewish population also emerged within the city, and made it a prosperous city with high economic and cultural achievements.

A peaceful coexistence emerged among the three cultures: Christians, Jews and Muslims. In the year 1479, the Jewish leader Rabí Mayr persuaded Isabella to remove the ban on Jews holding fairs and markets that existed in the Kingdom of Castile. This improved the economic levels of the city and allowed creation of the school of translators. At this time there were 600 Jewish families in Llerena, who lived in the vicinity of the synagogue (Chapel of Santa Catalina).

In 1490, the final Chapter General of the Order of Santiago was held, started in Uclés. It was called by the order's last master before that role was incorporated into the power of the Spanish Crown.

After Isabella signed the Decree of Expulsion of the Jews in 1492, 125 Jewish families remained in Llerena and became Jewish converts to Christianity.

=== Inquisition Court ===
In 1508, the Tribunal del Santo Oficio of the Inquisition court was instituted. Obtained by the influence of the degree Luis Zapata, Director and Advisor to Isabella, it was aided by the existence of a Jewish population in lower Extremadura. It was the third Court of Spain, as regards the extension of its jurisdiction. It occupied 42,260 square kilometers, and included the bishoprics of Ciudad Rodrigo, Piacenza, Coria, and Badajoz. Occupying three headquarters in Llerena, the Priory Palace in Zapatería Street, the House maestral Street La Prison and finally, until its abolition in 1834, Palace of the Zapata, now justice in la Corredera Street today.

Its period of maximum splendor was in the 16th century when it had seven convents, as well as a great cultural activity. During this century there was a large population increase that had only decreased by a certain amount of emigration to the New World, becoming the second largest population centre of Extremadura in 1591, behind the capital of Badajoz. At the end of the century it had 8,300 inhabitants.

In 1594, the census of population in the provinces and marches of the Crown of Castile in the 16th century was part of the Leon province and had 2,066 neighbors, including the suburbs of Llerena such as Maguilla.

In the year 1640, due to the growth it had achieved, Philip IV granted Llerena the title of City.

=== Decline ===
By the end of the 17th century the city's decline had begun, influenced by several factors: the political crisis in the Spanish Empire, war with Portugal, few suitable local rulers, the Moorish expulsion and successive plagues which kept it isolated from the outside during the quarantine.

In the 18th century the places of Higuera de Llerena in 1786 and Maguilla in 1749 achieved independence from the municipality. They had previously belonged to its City Council.

=== Independence ===
During the War of Independence (1808–1814), on the occasion of the Battle of Cantalgallo in 1810, produced a large destruction of the city. There were many buildings damaged and part of the archive was destroyed, and served as the seat to the chivalry, large number of works of art were plundered, as part of the altar of the Church of our Lady of Granada Zurbarán.

The fall of the old disappeared the Order of San Marcos in León, ceased to hold office in Llerena the Governor of the province and the party and decreed the abolition of the Holy Office in 1834 of the Inquisition. Then this city was in northeastern Extremadura and 1834 was capital and headquarters of the judicial district of Llerena.

=== Schism ===
After the Decree of suspension of the religious jurisdiction maintained centuries the military orders, Llerena produced the "schism", caused by the clergyman Don Francisco Maesso's jurisdiction of the bishopric of Badajoz. In just over a year there were several altercations that subsided when Alfonso XII to the throne, leading to the disappearance of that decree for Llerena.

=== Repossessions ===
The successive ground and building confiscations produced a great misfortune for the municipal economy of Llerena and to the rest of the neighborhood. Of Juan Álvarez Mendizábal of 1837 and Madoz in 1855, it was left almost without resources to the municipality of Llerena. He lost the dehesas of their property that he had maintained and exploited for centuries by providing significant benefits for the municipal coffers. Some convents, such as those dedicated to Santa Isabel, San Francisco, La Merced, San Sebastian, and La Concepción disappeared, leaving only the Santa Clara convent.

During the 19th century, some industries that remained in the city together with the construction of the railway line Mérida–Sevilla, in the second half of the century until its conclusion in the last section in 1885 between Llerena and El Pedroso, contributing to the economic progress of the region.

== Climate and geography ==
Llerena is located south of the province of Badajoz and belongs to the region of "The Countryside South." 114 km far from Badajoz and is located 638m. altitude. The municipal area of 162.3 km2 extending from the piedmont and foothills of Sierra Morena, in exactly the watershed of the Guadalquivir and Guadiana.

The terrain is varied, succeeding from north to south: the countryside, an area of sedimentation, with deep clay soils, soils with rickety, sandy and rocky towards the SE, where the topography starts to become more broken up finish in the Sierra de San Miguel.

The climate subtropical Mediterranean-type rom. The average annual temperature is 15.3 °C. Winters are generally mild with an average temperature of 7.3 °C summer is hot and dry with an average temperature of 24.2 °C. Seasonal The average rainfall is 586mm, with the rainy season in winter (227.6mm). The sclerophyllous Mediterranean forests are made up of oak along with other species including scrub, broom, lavender, and rock rose.

== Monuments and places of interest ==
- Plaza of Spain: area that was host to a bullring, market, and home celebrations. On the south side of the square is the Church of Our Lady of Granada is a balcony with two-story arcs. On the north side (opposite the church) is the portal of Casinet. It has had the nicknames: Portal of the Stores, the Pharmacy, the Pan, and the Prison. It has whitewashed brick arches, stone columns, two floors with balconies and windows, and run balustered auctions. On the east side is City Hall and the portal Morales, with nine arches. In some of the houses in this area lived the painter Francisco de Zurbarán and his wife. Nearby is the fountain designed by the painter in 1617.
- Our Lady of Granada: the church is located in the Town Hall Square, has a façade baroque with a balcony with 2 story arcs. This was an addition to the 18th century on the northern facade of the church in order to gain access to events that are manifest in the main square. The church has a magnificent tower of brick.
- Convento de Santa Clara: located across the street from the slide. It has a veranda with a polygonal lattice of stone. In his church there is a sculpture of St. Jerome of the sculptor Juan Martínez Montanes. You can also admire the wall paintings and baroque altarpieces.
- Zapata Palace: in the Plaza of the Inquisition, it is a good example of noble architecture with its patio. It was the seat of the Inquisition.
- Palacio Episcopal: the residence of the Priors of the Order of Santiago. Its cover is framed with alfiz and heraldry of the Order.

== Local festivities ==
- Madonna of the Pomegranate (festival on August 15)
- San Miguel Fair (September)
- Matanza teaching (early March)
- Tour "La Morolla" (not a local festival, but each year has more public on Easter Weekend)

== Notable people ==
- Luis Zapata de Cárdenas (1515–1590): archbishop of Bogotá.
- Miguel Sánchez de Llerena (1518–1601): founded Bogotá and Tunja in Colombia alongside Gonzalo Jiménez.
- Pedro Cieza de León (1520–1554): chronicler of the Indies. He brought the potato to Europe.
- Luis Zapata (1526–1595): writer and courtier to Philip II.
- García López de Cárdenas (16th century): discovered the Grand Canyon.
- Lorenzo Suárez de Figueroa (1530–1595): governor of Santa Cruz de la Sierra.
- Catalina Clara Ramírez de Guzmán (1618–1684/5): poet
- Juan de Zurbarán (1620–1649): painter, son of Francisco de Zurbarán, considered one of the finest still life painters of the Spanish Golden Age.
- José de Hermosilla (1776): architect and town planner. Author, among other works, and, along with Ventura Rodríguez, the urban project of the Salón del Prado (now known as the Paseo del Prado, also in Madrid). He also drafted the project of the Basilica San Francisco el Grande in Madrid.
- Don Pedro Gómez Durán y Chaves (1626): prominent member of the expedition led by Don Juan de Oñate to establish a capital city for New Spain in the territory of New Mexico. The city was founded in "La Villa Real de la Santa Fe de San Francisco de Asís" and named capitol in 1610. In modern times it is known as Santa Fe, New Mexico, the oldest capital city in the United States. By the time of his death he was named Commanding General of all royal troops under Spain in New Mexico.
- Miguel del Barco Gallego, organist

== Sister city ==
Llerena declared its sister city status with Sombrerete, located in the state of Zacatecas, Mexico, on May 5, 1992.

== See also ==
- List of municipalities in Badajoz
