= Province of Badajoz =

Province of Spain

Province of Badajoz Provincia de Badajoz (Spanish) Província de Badajoz (Portuguese)
- Province
- Flag Coat of arms

- Location of the Province of Badajoz in Spain
- Coordinates: 38°40′N 6°10′W
- Country: Spain
- Autonomous community: Extremadura
- Established: 1833
- Capital: Badajoz
- Municipalities: 165

Area
  - Total: 21,769.11 km^{2} (8,405.10 sq mi)
  - Rank: 1st in Spain

Population (2025)
  - Total: 665,155
  - Rank: 25th in Spain
  - Density: 30.5550/km^{2} (79.1371/sq mi)
- Demonym: Spanish: pacense
- Time zone: UTC+1 (CET)
  - Summer (DST): UTC+2 (CEST)
- ISO 3166 code: ES-BA
- Official language(s): Spanish
- Parliament: Cortes Generales

Comarcas in the province of Badajoz

The province of Badajoz (English: UK: /ˈbædəhɒz, -hɒs/ BAD-ə-hoz, -hoss, US: /ˌbɑːdəˈhoʊz/ BAH-də-HOHZ, Spanish: provincia de Badajoz [baðaˈxoθ]; Portuguese: província de Badajoz [bɐðɐˈʒɔʃ]) is a province of western Spain located in the autonomous community of Extremadura. Its capital is the city of Badajoz.

It was formed in 1833. It is bordered by the provinces of Cáceres in the north, Toledo, Ciudad Real in the east, Córdoba in the south-east, Seville, and Huelva in the south and Portugal in the west.

With an area of 21,769.11 km^{2} (8,405.10 sq mi), it is the largest province in Spain. The other province of Extremadura, Cáceres, is the second largest with 19,864.50 square kilometres (7,669.73 sq mi). With a population of 665,155, the province has a relatively lower population density in comparison to other provinces in Spain.

== History ==
The province enjoyed great prominence during the Roman Empire when Mérida was made one of the capital cities. When the Visigoth period ended and the Moors had invaded Spain, the Ibn-al-Aftas dynasty established a great cultural and scientific centre in the province. Many of the explorers who set out to conquer the New World were from this province.

== Geography ==
Although many districts have low hills ranges, the surface is more often a desolate and monotonous plain, flat or slightly undulating. Its one large river is the Guadiana, which traverses the north of the province from east to west, fed by many tributaries; but it is only at certain seasons that the river-bed fills with any considerable volume of water, and the Guadiana may frequently be forded without difficulty. The climate is continental with great extremes of heat in summer and of cold in winter, when fierce north and north-west winds blow across the plains. Mountains, pastures and Mediterranean forests are important geographical features of this province.

== Administrative divisions ==
The Province of Badajoz is divided into 165 municipalities. After Badajoz, the capital, the main towns in the province are Almendralejo, Azuaga, Don Benito, Olivenza, Jerez de los Caballeros, Mérida, Zafra, Montijo and Villanueva de la Serena.

There are also traditional comarcas (shires, but with no administrative role) in the province, including La Siberia and Llanos de Olivenza. The capital city of Badajoz is the most important commercial center of the province. The Council of Badajoz has its seat in this city.

The municipalities are:

- Acedera
- Aceuchal
- Ahillones
- Alange
- La Albuera
- Alburquerque
- Alconchel
- Alconera
- Aljucén
- Almendral
- Almendralejo
- Arroyo de San Serván
- Atalaya
- Azuaga
- Badajoz
- Barcarrota
- Baterno
- Benquerencia de la Serena
- Berlanga
- Bienvenida
- Bodonal de la Sierra
- Burguillos del Cerro
- Cabeza del Buey
- Cabeza la Vaca
- Calamonte
- Calera de León
- Calzadilla de los Barros
- Campanario
- Campillo de Llerena
- Capilla
- Carmonita
- El Carrascalejo
- Casas de Don Pedro
- Casas de Reina
- Castilblanco
- Castuera
- La Codosera
- Cordobilla de Lácara
- La Coronada
- Corte de Peleas
- Cristina
- Cheles
- Don Álvaro
- Don Benito
- Entrín Bajo
- Esparragalejo
- Esparragosa de la Serena
- Esparragosa de Lares
- Feria
- Fregenal de la Sierra
- Fuenlabrada de los Montes
- Fuente de Cantos
- Fuente del Arco
- Fuente del Maestre
- Fuentes de León
- Garbayuela
- Garlitos
- La Garrovilla
- Granja de Torrehermosa
- Guadiana
- Guareña
- La Haba
- Helechosa de los Montes
- Herrera del Duque
- Higuera de la Serena
- Higuera de Llerena
- Higuera de Vargas
- Higuera la Real
- Hinojosa del Valle
- Hornachos
- Jerez de los Caballeros
- La Lapa
- Lobón
- Llera
- Llerena
- Magacela
- Maguilla
- Malcocinado
- Malpartida de la Serena
- Manchita
- Medellín
- Medina de las Torres
- Mengabril
- Mérida
- Mirandilla
- Monesterio
- Montemolín
- Monterrubio de la Serena
- Montijo
- La Morera
- La Nava de Santiago
- Navalvillar de Pela
- Nogales
- Oliva de la Frontera
- Oliva de Mérida
- Olivenza
- Orellana de la Sierra
- Orellana la Vieja
- Palomas
- La Parra
- Peñalsordo
- Peraleda del Zaucejo
- Puebla de Alcocer
- Puebla de la Calzada
- Puebla de la Reina
- Puebla de Obando
- Puebla de Sancho Pérez
- Puebla del Maestre
- Puebla del Prior
- Pueblonuevo del Guadiana
- Quintana de la Serena
- Reina
- Rena
- Retamal de Llerena
- Ribera del Fresno
- Risco
- La Roca de la Sierra
- Salvaleón
- Salvatierra de los Barros
- San Pedro de Mérida
- San Vicente de Alcántara
- Sancti-Spíritus
- Santa Amalia
- Santa Marta
- Los Santos de Maimona
- Segura de León
- Siruela
- Solana de los Barros
- Talarrubias
- Talavera la Real
- Táliga
- Tamurejo
- Torre de Miguel Sesmero
- Torremayor
- Torremejía
- Trasierra
- Trujillanos
- Usagre
- Valdecaballeros
- Valdelacalzada
- Valdetorres
- Valencia de las Torres
- Valencia del Mombuey
- Valencia del Ventoso
- Valverde de Burguillos
- Valverde de Leganés
- Valverde de Llerena
- Valverde de Mérida
- Valle de la Serena
- Valle de Matamoros
- Valle de Santa Ana
- Villafranca de los Barros
- Villagarcía de la Torre
- Villagonzalo
- Villalba de los Barros
- Villanueva de la Serena
- Villanueva del Fresno
- Villar de Rena
- Villar del Rey
- Villarta de los Montes
- Zafra
- Zahínos
- Zalamea de la Serena
- La Zarza
- Zarza-Capilla

== Demographics ==
Historical population
Year	Pop.	±%
1842	295,923	—
1857	404,981	+36.9%
1877	428,015	+5.7%
1887	476,273	+11.3%
1900	519,079	+9.0%
1910	593,550	+14.3%
1920	651,156	+9.7%
1930	703,389	+8.0%
1940	746,678	+6.2%
1950	817,703	+9.5%
1960	849,570	+3.9%
1970	701,709	−17.4%
1981	643,519	−8.3%
1991	650,388	+1.1%
2001	654,882	+0.7%
2011	691,799	+5.6%
2021	671,092	−3.0%
Source: INE

As of 2025, the population is 665,155, of which 49.3% are male, and 50.7% are female. Minors make up 16.2% of the population, and seniors make up 21.5%.

=== Immigration ===
As of 2025, immigrants make up 5.5% of the population. The 5 largest foreign countries of birth are Romania, Colombia, Morocco, Portugal, and Brazil.

== Economy ==
The economic production differs according to the region and locality. Thus the big cities like Badajoz, Mérida, Don Benito, Almendralejo and others, offer and live from services and to a lesser extent from general industries of medium type. In the regions of Guadiana, Tierra de Mérida – Vegas Bajas, Vegas Altas and part of Tierra de Badajoz, and in Tierra de Barros besides the traditional source of agricultural wealth, there is a flourishing industry of agro-livestock transformation. In other regions more distant from urban centres and the main roads, such as Campiña Sur, La Serena and La Siberia, the main source is the primary sector, i.e. agriculture and perhaps even more livestock (sheep and pig).

The agricultural sector is dominated by irrigated areas in the Guadiana Valley (Badajoz, Montijo, Mérida, Don Benito-Villanueva), the predominant olive groves in Tierra de Barros, and the vineyards, extensive in Tierra de Barros and in Llerena (Campiña Sur).

The industrial sector, although less developed and very low in proportion to national activity, has a proportion of employed population similar to the agro-livestock sector: 12.13% (up to 26% if we include construction) compared to 14% (primary sector). The two main cities of the province stand out: Badajoz and Mérida, with their respective industrial parks; and the towns of Jerez de los Caballeros, Don Benito-Villanueva and Almendralejo.

The tertiary sector is the most predominant sector in the province (61.87% of the population employed), where the business (Almendralejo and Zafra), commercial (Badajoz) and tourism and administrative (Mérida) sectors stand out.

== Tourism ==
The economy of the province is based on tourism and agriculture. Some of the popular tourist destinations of the province include Badajoz, Fregenal de la Sierra, Jerez de los Caballeros, Llerena, Mérida, Olivenza, Alange, Alburquerque and Almendralejo. The popular dishes include hare, partridge and various pork products. Cornalvo Nature Reserve, the ancient structure of Roman Theatre in Mérida, National Museum of Roman Art in Mérida, Alcazaba City Wall and Ibn Marwan Monument and Espantaperros Tower of Badajoz Fortress are popular tourist spots.

The National Museum of Roman Art was designed in 1980 by architect José Rafael Moneo Vallés and completed in 1985. The architect designed the museum to have a Roman feel and look. Romans used to control present-day Spain (and the entire Iberian Peninsula) in the years following their arrival around 295 BC. Today, Mérida has the greatest number of noteworthy Roman buildings still surviving. It is also famous on an archaeological basis. The museum exhibits remnants of Roman infrastructure and dwellings, including those showing Christian influences like a basilica, and tombs. Inspiration for the National Museum of Roman Art dates back to 1838, when the city located the museum in a church, Santa Clara.

== See also ==
- Extremadura

== Notes and references ==
- Chisholm, Hugh, ed. (1911). "Badajoz (province)" . Encyclopædia Britannica. Vol. 03 (11th ed.). Cambridge University Press. p. 181.
