= Ahillones =

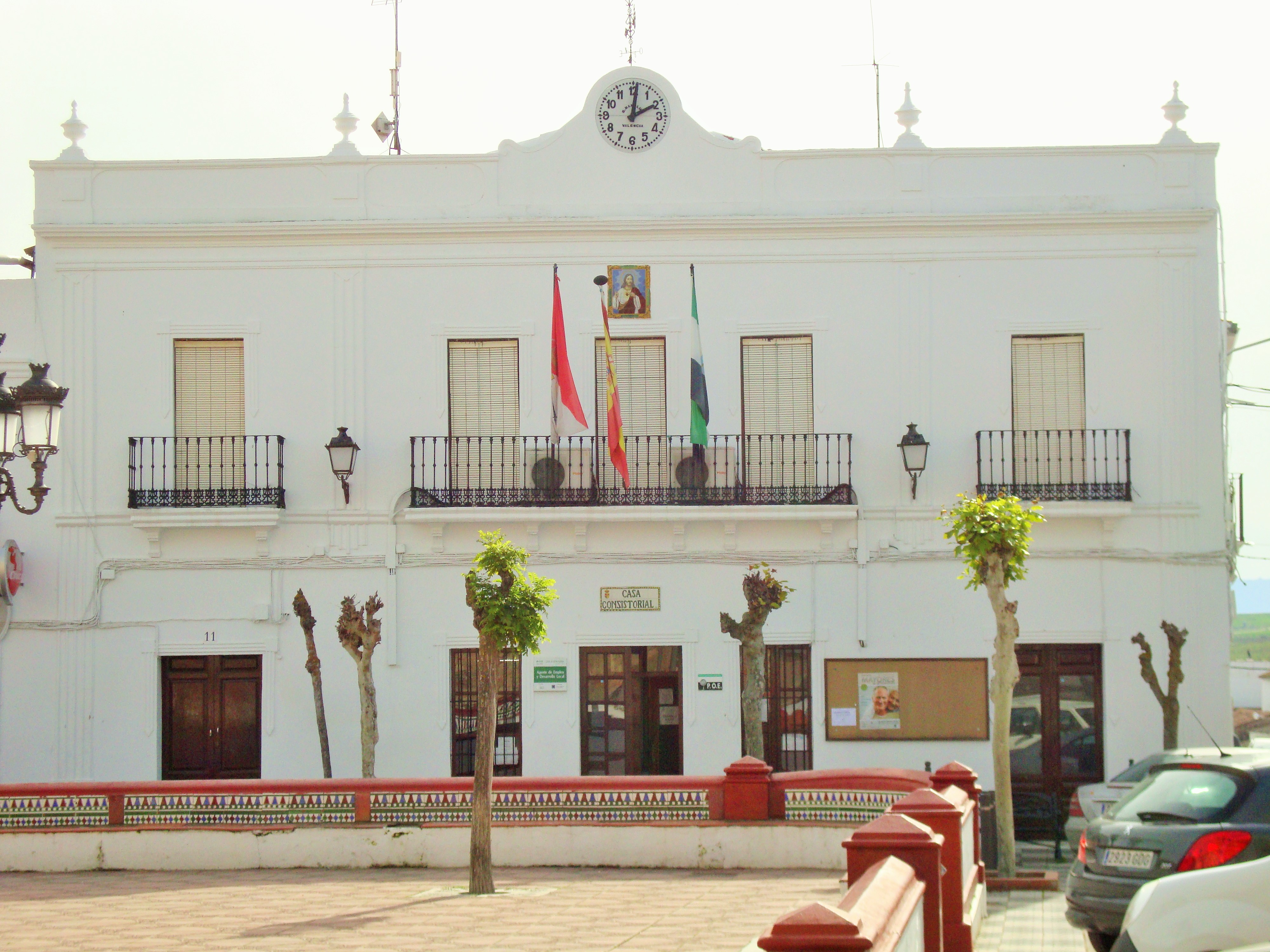

- Coat of arms

- Location of Ahillones within Extremadura
- Coordinates: 38°15′35″N 5°51′51″W
- Country: Spain
- Autonomous community: Extremadura
- Province: Badajoz
- Comarca: Campiña Sur

Area
  - Total: 21.5 km^{2} (8.3 sq mi)

Population (2025-01-01)
  - Total: 793
- Time zone: UTC+1 (CET)
  - Summer (DST): UTC+2 (CEST)

Ahillones is a Spanish municipality in the province of Badajoz, Extremadura. It has a population of 1,064 (2007) and an area of 21.5 km^{2} (8.3 sq mi).

== See also ==
- List of municipalities in Badajoz
