= Villagarcía de la Torre =

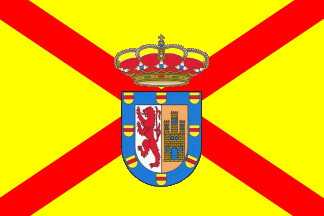
- Flag Coat of arms
- Interactive map of Villagarcía de la Torre
- Coordinates: 38°17′N 06°04′W
- Country: Spain
- Autonomous community: Extremadura
- Province: Badajoz
- Municipality: Villagarcía de la Torre

Area
  - Total: 67 km^{2} (26 sq mi)
- Elevation: 587 m (1,926 ft)

Population (2025-01-01)
  - Total: 909
  - Density: 14/km^{2} (35/sq mi)
- Time zone: UTC+1 (CET)
  - Summer (DST): UTC+2 (CEST)

Villagarcía de la Torre (Extremaduran: Villagarcía dela Torri) is a municipality located in the province of Badajoz, Extremadura, Spain. According to the 2006 census (INE), the municipality has a population of 1003 inhabitants.

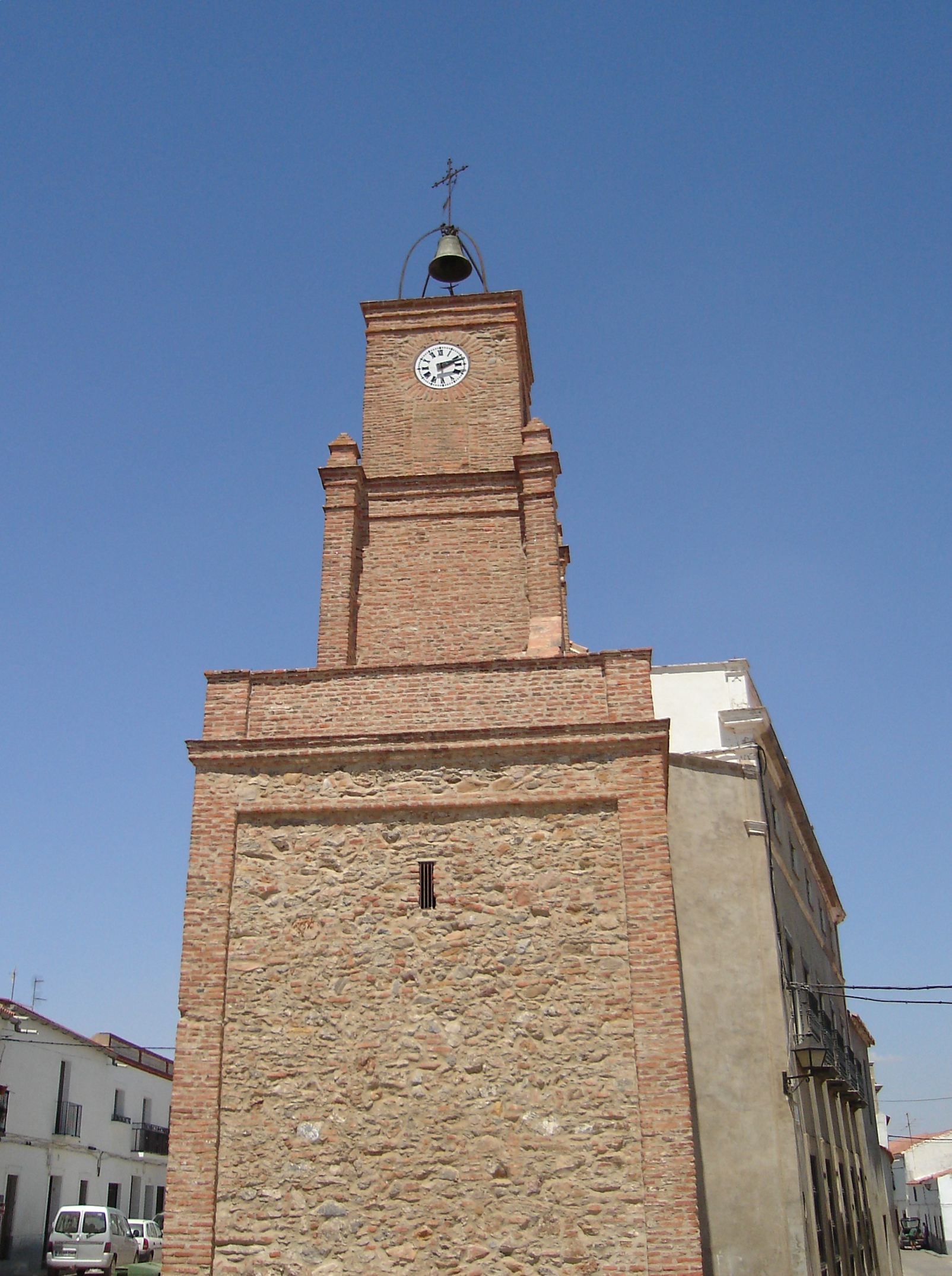
Clock tower in Villagarcía de la Torre

== See also ==
- List of municipalities in Badajoz
