= Llera, Badajoz =

Llera
- Municipality
- Flag Coat of arms

- Location of Llera within Extremadura
- Coordinates: 38°26′55″N 6°3′26″W
- Country: Spain
- Autonomous community: Extremadura
- Province: Badajoz
- Comarca: Campiña Sur

Government
  - Alcalde: Ana Torres Márquez (PSOE)

Area
  - Total: 71.5 km^{2} (27.6 sq mi)
- Elevation: 481 m (1,578 ft)

Population (2025-01-01)
  - Total: 781
  - Density: 10.9/km^{2} (28.3/sq mi)
- Time zone: UTC+1 (CET)
  - Summer (DST): UTC+2 (CEST)
- Website: Ayuntamiento de Llera

Llera is a Spanish municipality in the province of Badajoz, Extremadura, western Spain. According to the 2014 census, the municipality has a population of 905 inhabitants.

== Geography ==
The municipality of Llera is geographically located in the province of Badajoz, on the southern slope of the Sierra de Hornachos, forming a transition area between the Tierra de Barros, Sierra Morena and La Serena.

Llera belongs to the judicial district of Llerena and the village is located about 105 km from the capital.

Llera was established at the time of the Visigoths (600 years), by a population from Hornachos, under the Cerro de la Virgen, in an area called Jarandilla, at the time due to its abundance of rock roses. In the sixteenth century documents still referred to this enclave as Hornachos Llera.

== Local university ==
The People's University of Llera was born as a cultural development project aimed at promoting social participation and continuing education for all groups, to improve the quality of life. Their objectives include: facilitating the development the educated citizen, social and cultural development, facilitating the integration of all groups in their social environment, encouraging citizen participation, eliminating inequalities and discrimination that exist in different social environments.

== See also ==
- List of municipalities in Badajoz
