= Maguilla =

- municipality
- Coat of arms

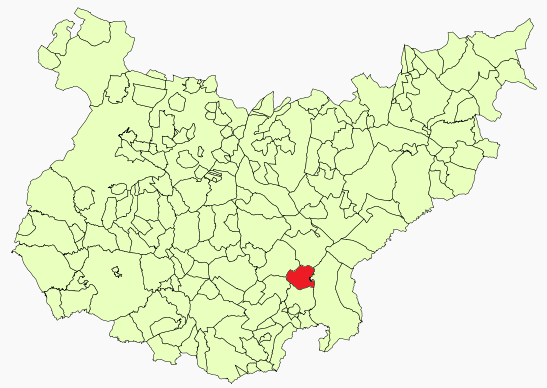
- Location in Badajoz

- Location of Maguilla within Extremadura
- Coordinates: 38°22′3″N 5°50′15″W
- Country: Spain
- Autonomous community: Extremadura
- Province: Badajoz

Area
  - Total: 98 km^{2} (38 sq mi)
- Elevation: 526 m (1,726 ft)

Population (2025-01-01)
  - Total: 919
  - Density: 9.4/km^{2} (24/sq mi)
- Time zone: UTC+1 (CET)
  - Summer (DST): UTC+2 (CEST)

Maguilla is a municipality located in Badajoz Province, Extremadura, Spain. According to the 2005 census (INE), the municipality has a population of 1132 inhabitants.

== See also ==
- List of municipalities in Badajoz
