= Campillo de Llerena =

- Coat of arms

- Location of Campillo de Llerena within Extremadura
- Coordinates: 38°30′3″N 5°49′57″W
- Country: Spain
- Autonomous community: Extremadura
- Province: Badajoz
- Municipality: Campillo de Llerena

Area
  - Total: 234 km^{2} (90 sq mi)
- Elevation: 502 m (1,647 ft)

Population (2025-01-01)
  - Total: 1,321
  - Density: 5.65/km^{2} (14.6/sq mi)
- Time zone: UTC+1 (CET)
  - Summer (DST): UTC+2 (CEST)
- Website: Ayuntamiento de Campillo de Llerena

Campillo de Llerena is a municipality located in the province of Badajoz, Extremadura, Spain. According to a 2005 census (INE), the municipality has a population of 1,624.

== Geography ==
Located north of Llerena, located at 46 km, and 128 km of Badajoz.

The municipality is isolated in the Centre of a vast territory of settlements. The soil is hard and the landscape is defined by a terrain where the Plains and the undulations are giving place to a more rugged terrain.

The term covers an area of 234 km^{2} of land. In extension, the people made 27th among the 162 of the province. Belongs to the commerce of the Southern countryside in Badajoz and the judicial branch of Llerena.

The term is quite mountainous. The village sits on a small hill on a granite outcrop, among a series of hills consisting of cuarcitos Silurian predominate Brown Mediterranean soil and Rotlehm.

The most important elevations are in the east of the term, in a small mountain range called Argallén, branch of Peraleda, moving from North to South. Other unmentionable elevations are the mountains of Cork, Sierra Chica, Sierra del Prado, Cornejo and Cerro Myron, with heights ranging from 550 to 675 m above sea level.

It's known for its stones: the stone of the Sierpe in the Majadillas, of the friars in la Calera, of the Gaul in the Aflmoches, the rock of the Caserío Dehesilla, and the stones of the drum, the cat and the Castillo, these three very close to the village. All children have played in them, to "civil and thieves."

== History ==
In 1594, written in the Book of the Million, the population census of the provinces and parties of the Crown of Castile in 16th century was part of the province Order of Santiago de Leon and had 404 pecheros neighbors.

The fall of the old system of the town, then known as "'Campillo'", was established in constitutional municipality in the region of Extremadura. It was integrated in the judicial district of Llerena from 1834.

== Climate ==
The climate is Mediterranean, with Atlantic influence, with more accused characters in the dry and hot summer maximum, which in winter minimum. The average annual temperature is about 16 °C, which brings us to define the climate. The average minimum is between 7 and 9 °C, with minimal absolute not often lose 5, the average maximum ranging between 25 and 29 °C, with absolute maximum of the order of 40 °C and sometimes higher.

The rains have greater intensity during the spring and autumn. The average annual rainfall is about 54 cm. In autumn, especially in the months of September and October, downloadable heavy storms, which also tend to register beforehand, though more weak in May and June.

The dominant winds are Galician or Northwest, South, and the Solano or East; rains usually the bring of the South, and when it blows Northwest produce showers, popularly called.

== Urban topography ==
The houses are Andalusian whitewashed usually whitewashed façades with balconies and iron Windows and roofs to two aspects of regular inclination or rifan type. They consist of two floors, the lower used as housing and of above called 'doblao', was used to save the tools of farmhouse or barn. Currently, they are becoming homes. These houses were formerly stables for the horses, or the partly rear or attached to one side of the housing. Currently they are not necessary and they are becoming garage or warehouse.

== Economy ==
Stop population is often a result of the progress of the economy of the area that is settled, and it depends in turn of existing natural resources, structural policy, and the own-initiative of the people, i.e., is a process in a circle that can be opened by those with decision-making power. The important thing is to know which is the current situation in each sector, glimpse the needs of certain goods and services, to try to take advantage of market gaps.

The productive structure of Campillo responds to the schema of an area with a medium-low development level. It is characterized by the high weight of trade to the minor, and a considerable importance of construction and auxiliary companies because, in recent years, being key drivers for the creation of employment in the locality.

== Agriculture ==
A municipality as Campillo, located in a mainly agricultural and livestock, could not have a significant primary sector in its economy.

The abundant grazing has allow also the development of an important cottage of the pig (52.3%) and something less than sheep (35.4%).

Most of the rural area is dedicated to pastures (29.6%), still well below the number of cultivated land. Crops include oats (17.6%) in rainfed and irrigated oilseed rape (46.2%) and the Sunflower (40%).

The land is usually distributed in holdings (46.7 per cent of farms are under 5 hectares). Most common tenure regimes are the direct exploitation of the land by the owner (68.7 enumerated surface). Holders are mostly elderly between 55 and 65 (33.6 per cent) and being his main occupation only in exploitation (58.7%).

Another aspect important to take into account when concluding what the State and prospects for the sector is the level of mechanization, which del Campillo is optimal.

== Services ==
The majority of companies that can fit in this sector are related to the primary needs and leisure satisfaction. Thus, firstly appear dedicated to trade to the retail non-food products, followed by the food.

On the other hand, within the sector services have mentioned the catering trade, in the section on restaurants, bars and hotels there are 13 in number.

There is a group of 8 professionals that offer their services independently, classifying them into the category of professional activities (commercial agents, medical, veterinary, lawyers).

== See also ==
- List of municipalities in Badajoz
