= Our Lady's Church =

Our Lady's Church may refer to:

- Church of Our Lady
- St. Mary's Church

Single examples:

- St. Mary's or Our Lady's Church, Glendalough
- Our Lady's Church, Acomb, a Catholic parish church in Acomb, York, England

It is also the translation of church names in other languages:

- Notre Dame (disambiguation)
- Nuestra Señora (disambiguation)
- Liebfrauenkirche (disambiguation)
- Frauenkirche (disambiguation)
