= Church of Our Lady =

Church of Our Lady may refer to:

== Belgium ==
- Cathedral of Our Lady (Antwerp)
- Church of Our Lady, Bruges
- Church of Our Lady (Kortrijk)
- Church of Our Lady of Laeken, site of the royal crypt, Brussels
- Church of Our Lady, Melsele

== Canada ==
- Church of Our Lady Immaculate, Guelph, Ontario

== China ==
- Cathedral of Our Lady, Shuozhou

== Czech Republic ==
- Church of Our Lady before Týn, Prague

== Denmark ==
- Church of Our Lady (Aarhus), former cathedral church
- Church of Our Lady, Assens
- Church of Our Lady (Copenhagen), cathedral
- Church of Our Lady, Kalundborg
- Abbey of Our Lady, Aalborg
- Catholic Church of Our Lady (Aarhus)
- Old Church of Our Lady, Roskilde

== Germany ==
- Church of Our Lady (Bremen)
- Church of Our Lady, Dresden

== Netherlands ==
- Church of Our Lady (Amsterdam)
- Church of Our Lady (Breda)

== Norway ==
- Vår Frue Cathedral (Tromsø) — Roman Catholic Cathedral
- Vår Frue Church in Trondheim
- Vår Frue Church (Porsgrunn)

== Sweden ==
- Church of Our Lady, Gothenburg

== United Kingdom ==
- Our Lady Help of Christians Church, Luton, Bedfordshire
- Church of the Assumption of Our Lady, Torquay, Devon
- Our Lady of Gillingham Church, Gillingham, Kent
- Our Lady and All Saints Church, Parbold, Lancashire
- Church of Our Lady of Reconciliation, Liverpool
- Our Lady of Willesden Church, London
- Our Lady of Mount Carmel and St Patrick Church, Oldham, Greater Manchester
- Our Lady and the Apostles Church, Stockport, Greater Manchester
- Our Lady of the Annunciation Church, King's Lynn, Norfolk
- Our Lady of the Sacred Heart Church, Wellingborough, Northamptonshire
- Our Lady and St Edmund's Church, Abingdon, Oxfordshire
- Shrine Church of Our Lady of Consolation and St Francis, West Grinstead, West Sussex
- Church of our Lady: A Serbian Orthodox, Halifax, West Yorkshire
- Our Lady and St Alphonsus Church, Hanley Swan, Worcestershire
- Our Lady of Mount Carmel Church, Redditch, Worcestershire
- Our Lady and St James Church, Bangor, Gwynedd, Wales

== United States ==
- Church of Our Lady of Grace (Hoboken, New Jersey), listed on the U.S. National Register of Historic Places

== Other countries ==
- Church of Our Lady of Kazan (Tallinn), in Tallinn, Estonia

== See also ==
- Frauenkirche (disambiguation), German shortened version for "Church of Our Lady"
- Liebfrauenkirche (disambiguation), German for "Church of Our Dear Lady"
- Notre Dame (disambiguation), French for "Our Lady"
- Nuestra Señora (disambiguation), Spanish for "Our Lady"
- Onze-Lieve-Vrouwekerk (disambiguation), Dutch for "Church of Our Lady"
- Our Lady of Mount Carmel Church
