= Nuestra Señora (disambiguation) =

Nuestra Señora is Spanish for Mary, mother of Jesus.

Nuestra Señora may also refer to:

== Costa Rica ==
- Iglesia de la Nuestra Señora de las Mercedes, a church in Grecia, Costa Rica

== Puerto Rico ==
- Nuestra Señora de Lourdes Chapel in Santurce, Puerto Rico

== Mexico ==
- Iglesia de Nuestra Señora de los Remedios (Mexico) in Cholula, Puebla, Mexico
- Nuestra Señora de Loreto Church in Mexico City, Mexico

== Philippines ==
- Nuestra Señora de los Desamparados Church in Manila, Philippines

== Spain ==
- Iglesia de Nuestra Señora de la Palma in Algeciras, Spain
- Capilla de Nuestra Señora de Europa in Algeciras, Spain
- Nuestra Señora de la Candelaria in Candelaria, Tenerife, Spain
- Church of Nuestra Señora del Manzano in Castrojeriz, Burgos, Spain
- Church of Nuestra Señora de las Nieves (Cenizate) in Cenizate, Spain
- Nuestra Señora de la Soterraña in Santa María la Real de Nieva, Segovia, Spain
- Nuestra Señora de Gracia Parish Church in Palomas, Badajoz, Extremadura, Spain
- Church of Nuestra Señora de la Peña de Faido in Peñacerrada, Spain
- Church of Nuestra Señora de la Esperanza in Peñas de San Pedro, Spain
- Catedral de Nuestra Señora de la Huerta de Tarazona in Tarazona, Zaragoza, Spain
- Nuestra Señora de Montserrat in Madrid, Spain

== United States ==
- La Iglesia de Nuestra Señora la Reina de los Ángeles in Los Angeles, California, United States
- Nuestra Señora Reina de los Ángeles Asistencia in Los Angeles, California, United States

== Uruguay ==
- Cristo Obrero y Nuestra Señora de Lourdes in Estación Atlántida, Uruguay
- Nuestra Señora del Carmen, Aguada, Montevideo in Montevideo, Uruguay
- Nuestra Señora de los Dolores (Tierra Santa), Montevideo in Montevideo, Uruguay
- Nuestra Señora de Lourdes y San Vicente Pallotti, Montevideo in Montevideo, Uruguay

== See also ==
- Church of Our Lady (disambiguation)
