= Onze-Lieve-Vrouwekerk =

Onze-Lieve-Vrouwekerk (Church of Our Lady) is a common church dedication in Belgium and the Netherlands and may refer to:

- Cathedral of Our Lady (Antwerp), Belgium
- Church of Our Lady, Bruges, Belgium
- Church of Our Lady, Kortrijk, Belgium
- Church of Our Lady of Laeken, Belgium
- Church of Our Lady across the river Dijle, Mechelen, Belgium
- Basilica of Our Lady of Hanswijk, Mechelen, Belgium
- Church of Our Lady, Melsele, Belgium
- Basilica of Our Lady of Scherpenheuvel, Belgium
- Church of Our Lady, Sint-Niklaas, Belgium
- Lievenvrouwenkerk, Sint-Truiden, Belgium
- Basilica of Our Lady, Tongeren, Belgium
- Church of Our Lady, Vilvoorde, Belgium
- Onze-Lieve-Vrouw ten Troost, Vilvoorde, Belgium
- Onze Lieve Vrouwetoren, Amersfoort, Netherlands
- Church of Our Lady, Amsterdam, Netherlands
- Grote Kerk (Breda), Netherlands
- Vrouwekerk, Leiden, Netherlands
- Basilica of Our Lady, Maastricht, Netherlands

== See also ==
- Church of Our Lady (disambiguation)
- Onze-Lieve-Vrouwekapel (disambiguation)
