= Liebfrauenkirche =

Liebfrauenkirche (Church of Our Dear Lady) is a common dedication for churches in German-speaking countries.

Liebfrauenkirche may refer to:

- Church of Our Lady (Bremen)
- Liebfrauen, Frankfurt, a Gothic church in the centre of Frankfurt am Main
- Liebfrauenkirche, Goslar, a former chapel of the Imperial Palace of Goslar, Germany
- Liebfrauenkirche, Halle
- Liebfrauenkirche, Mainz, a portion of Mainz Cathedral, Germany, that was demolished in 1803
- Liebfrauenkirche, Trier, an early Gothic cathedral in Trier, Germany
- Liebfrauenkirche, Worms, a church on the outskirts of Worms, Germany, whose surrounding vineyards originated the Liebfraumilch style of wine
- Überwasserkirche, Münster, North Rhine-Westphalia, Germany
- Liebfrauenkirche, Zurich, a Catholic church in Zurich, Switzerland

== See also ==
- Frauenkirche (disambiguation)
- Freiburg Minster, or Münster Unserer Lieben Frau
- St. Mary's Church (disambiguation)
- Church of Our Lady (disambiguation)
- Onze-Lieve-Vrouwekerk (disambiguation)
