= Liebfrauenkirche, Zurich =

Catholic church in Zurich

Liebfrauenkirche
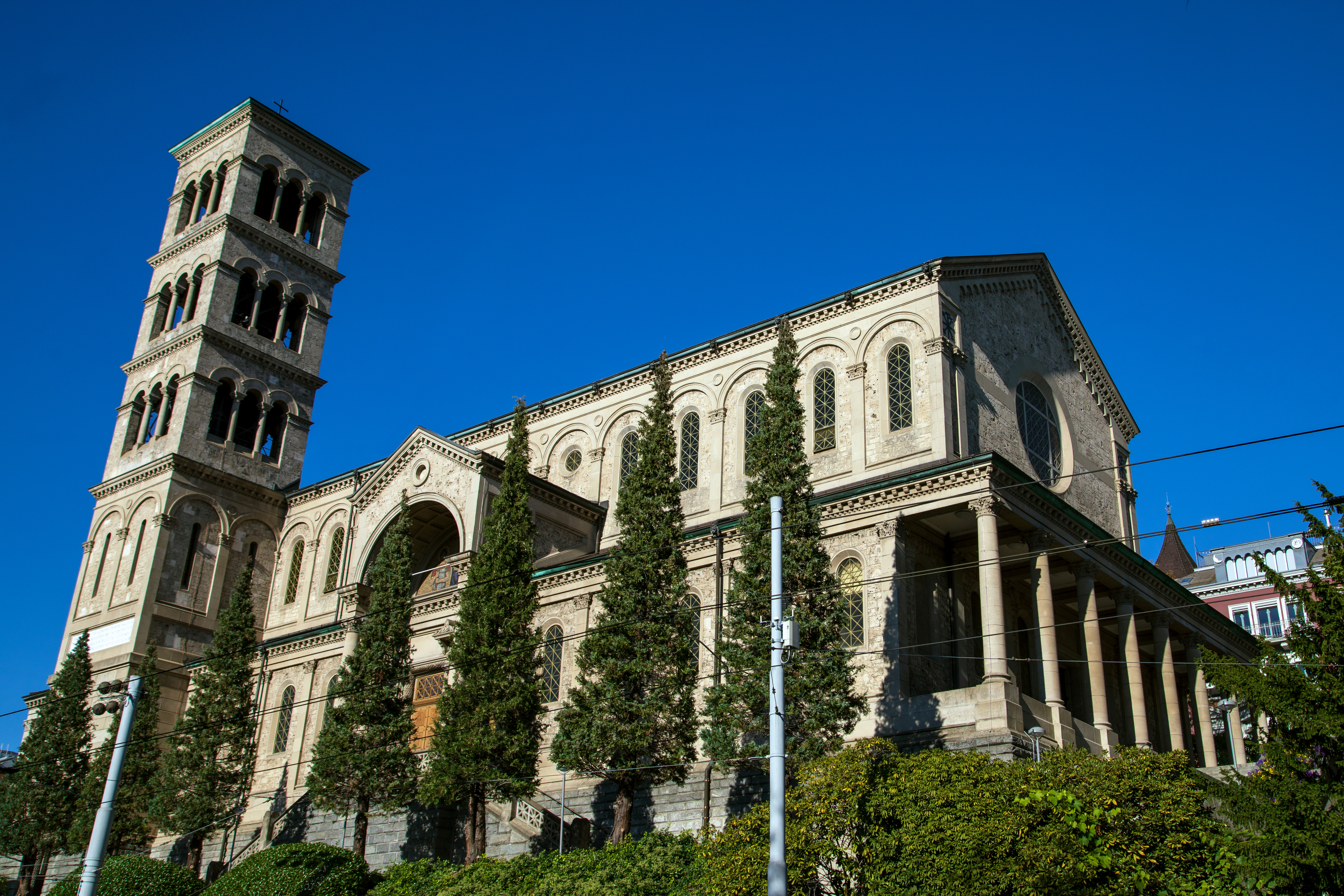
- Liebfrauenkirche seen from the southern corner, with its distinct bell tower
- Liebfrauenkirche
- 47°22′47″N 8°32′42″E
- Location: 9 Zehnderweg, Zurich, Switzerland
- Denomination: Catholic Church
- Website: liebfrauen.ch

Architecture
- Style: Romanesque Revival
- Completed: 7 October 1894

Administration
- Diocese: Chur

Liebfrauenkirche (lit. 'Dear Lady Church') is a Catholic church in Zurich, Switzerland. Due to the influx of Catholic immigration in Zurich in the 19th century, it was built from 1893 to 1894 under the Romanesque Revival architecture designs of the architect August Hardegger. Its patron saint is Mary, Mother of God.

== History ==
=== Origins ===
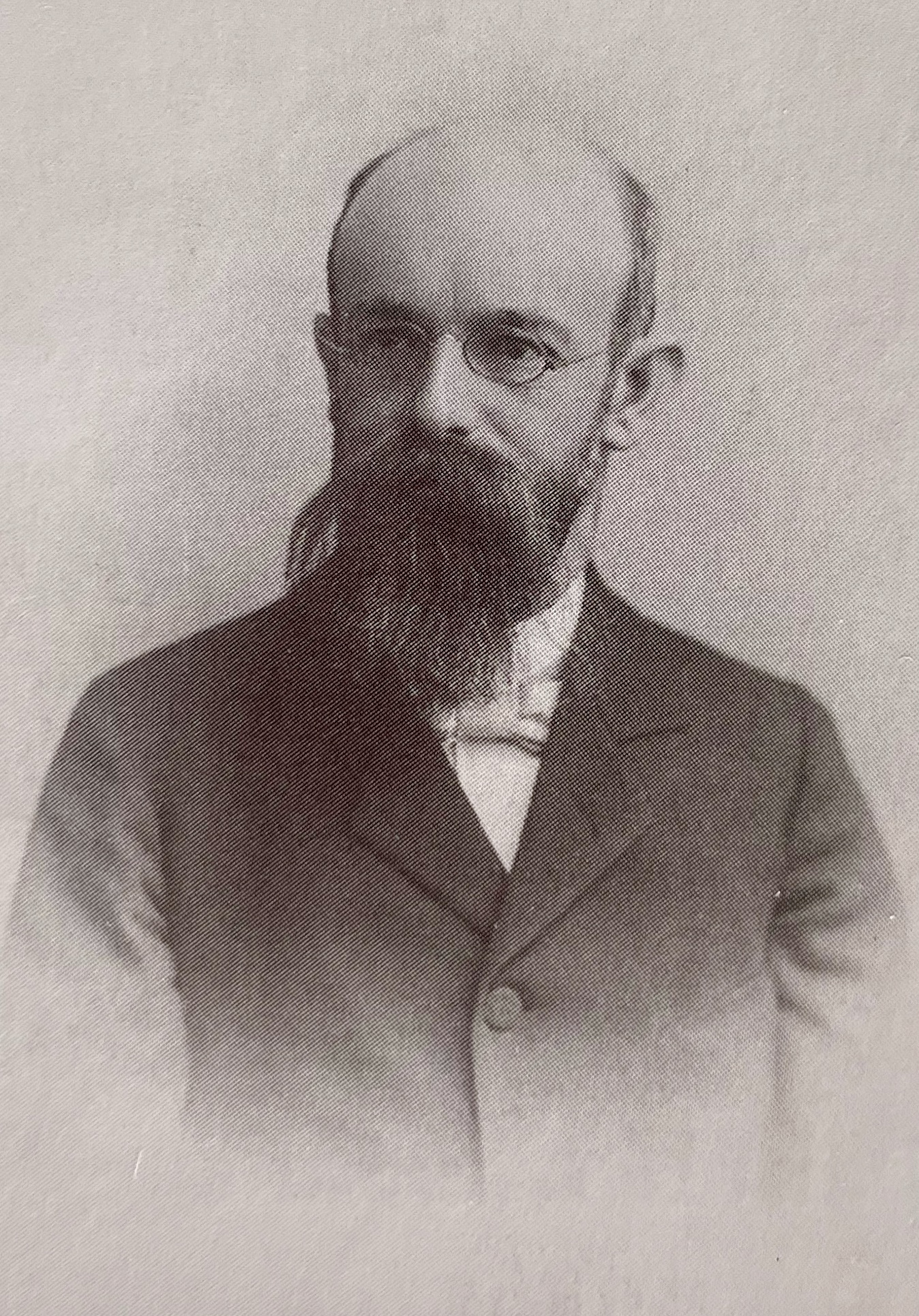
August Hardegger (1858 – 1927), architect of Liebfrauenkirche, in 1900

In the 19th century, an increasing number of Catholics from eastern and central Switzerland migrated to Zurich, and the need for a Catholic church arose. In 1842, the Zurich government rented the Augustinerkirche to the Catholic community, which at the time made up about 5 percent of the population. After the Old Catholic Church split off from the Roman Catholic Church in 1871, the Roman Catholic believers in the working-class Aussersihl district built the Sts. Peter and Paul Church in 1874. As a result of further growth of the Catholic population, the parish of Sts. Peter and Paul became the largest Roman Catholic parish in Switzerland in the 1890s, and the construction of additional churches became necessary.

In 1886, a church building association was founded to build a second Catholic church in Zurich next to Sts. Peter and Paul in Aussersihl. In 1889, the association attempted to acquire a building site on the shores of Lake Zurich, but was prevented due to religious reservations in Zurich. After this failure, the community made an appeal for donations with the approval of the Bishop of Chur, which drew attention to the struggling situation of the Catholics in Zurich and eventually provided the necessary funds to purchase lots and plan church buildings. In 1891, the lots for Liebfrauenkirche and Sacred Heart Church were purchased in Unterstrass and Oerlikon, respectively. The purchase of the lot for Liebfrauenkirche was indirectly linked to the question of locating the Swiss National Museum: in order to persuade the Catholic cantons to set the museum in Zurich, an offer was made to facilitate the purchase of the desired building site for the church.

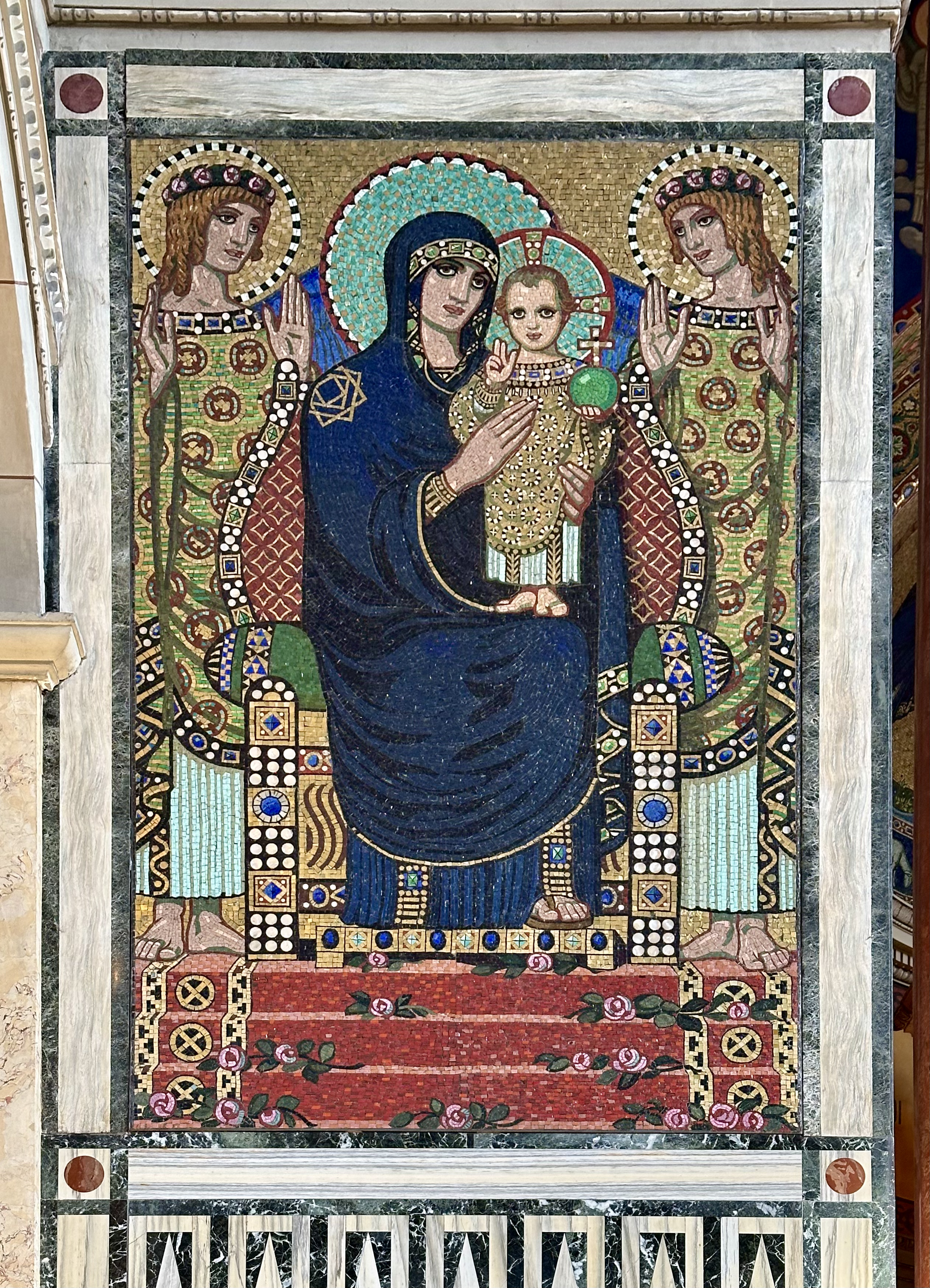
A mosaic of the Blessed Virgin Mary, the church's patron saint, inside the church. The choice of Mary as the patron saint was intended to emphasise the distinction between Catholicism and other denominations.

The church was constructed from 1892 to 1894 according to the designs of the architect August Hardegger, who modelled the church in the style of an early Christian basilica based on buildings from Rome and Ravenna. Hardegger developed his idea together with the art historian and hermit Albert Kuhn, who convinced the church building association to accept this style. Hardegger intended to use Liebfrauenkirche's Italian influences to express the connection between the Catholic Church in Switzerland and the Pope in Rome, in the spirit of ultramontanism during the Kulturkampf period. In this way, the Catholic diaspora in Zurich would distance itself both from the Old Catholics and the Reformed Christians. The choice of Mary, Mother of God as the patron saint was made in consultation with the priests and the Bishop of Chur. It expresses the Marian piety of the time and emphasised the distinction between denominations.

The church was originally planned to seat 1,200 people and have two towers. However, for cost reasons, the church could only have 1,000 seats and one tower. On 13 May 1893, the foundation stone was laid at the northeast corner of the tower. During the church's construction, its first rectory was also built in neo-Romanesque style to the northwest below the church. The church was consecrated on 7 October 1894.

=== Modern era ===
A preschool was founded at the rectory since 1897. In 1923 the girls' school was inaugurated in the nearby Hirschengraben area; today the girls' school is used as the headquarters of the Central Commission and the General Vicariate of Zurich and Glarus stands. In 1954–1955, the original rectory was replaced by the current building, designed as a simple cube by Karl Higi.

From 1980 to 1981, the church was renovated by the architect Otto Glaus. A crypt was installed and consecrated in December 1981. The two side altars were removed and the previous terrazzo flooring was replaced with a new mosaic floor. When the church reopened after the renovation, Einsiedeln Abbey donated relics of Saints Felix and Regula, patron saints of Zurich, to Liebfrauenkirche. The relics are kept in a niche under the People's altar.

From 2010 to 2011, the interior of the church was renovated by the architecture firm Staffelbach Meier.

== Architecture ==
According to R. Fischer, Liebfrauenkirche is one of the most important and harmonious historicist buildings in the Catholic diaspora of Zurich. It stands on an artificially elevated terrace above Leonhardstrasse and Weinbergstrasse. For topographical reasons, the church faces south. The long building is in basilica form with a main aisle and two side aisle. The bell tower is connected to the choir apse. A closed ambulatory is built around the apse, which serves as a sacristy.

The interior of the three-aisled Liebfrauenkirche is evenly divided by arcades upon massive pillars and by clerestory windows. The open roof structure underlines the Romanesque character of the church. In the raised, recessed choir there is a square presbytery. The choir is enclosed by an apse.

When the church was consecrated in 1894, its decorations were simple due to a lack of funds. The walls were painted with a reserved illusionistic ceiling painting and simple friezes. The windows, with their diamond grilles, did not have stained glass as planned, but only plain colorless glass. Only the ceiling of the church, which was not designed as coffered but with open trusses, was richly decorated: the beams were painted in color and their design was based on the church of San Miniato al Monte in Florence. The truss beams in the nave show the words of the Apostles' Creed, whereas the ones in the choir bear the Agnus Dei text.

In the following years, the church's decorations were added piece by piece through donations and legacies; overall they appear to be uniform. One of the additions was the frescoes and mosaics in the choir designed by Fritz Kunz, which stands between late Nazarene realism and a strict hierarchical conception. In 1922, the gallery was extended by the architect Anton Higi, and the fresco in the main nave and the mosaic above the west portal were done Fritz Kunz in 1923–1924. The sculptor Alois Payer completed the 14 Stations of the Cross 1924, which have been on the walls of the church ever since.

The church's high altar and pulpit were designed by August Hardegger, and the tabernacle and the cross in the high altar were made by the Central Swiss artist Josef Rickenbacher. The free-standing altar, ambo, and candleholders were designed by the architect Otto Glaus, and the baptismal font was made by Richard Arthur Nüscheler.

The cycle of murals around the church was painted by Fritz Kunz based on pictorial decorations and iconographic themes of early Christian basilicas. The nave contains scenes from the life of Jesus Christ and the Blessed Virgin Mary. In the choir, the frescoes and the mosaic refer to the heavenly paradise according to the Book of Revelation. The gold mosaic of the apse shows Christ enthroned in the center as King of Heaven and ruler of the world over the four rivers of paradise. His right hand is raised in blessing, and his left hand holds the Book of Life. At his sides stand Mary and John the Baptist. The twelve lambs in the frieze below symbolize the disciples of Jesus and the believers who follow the divine shepherd.

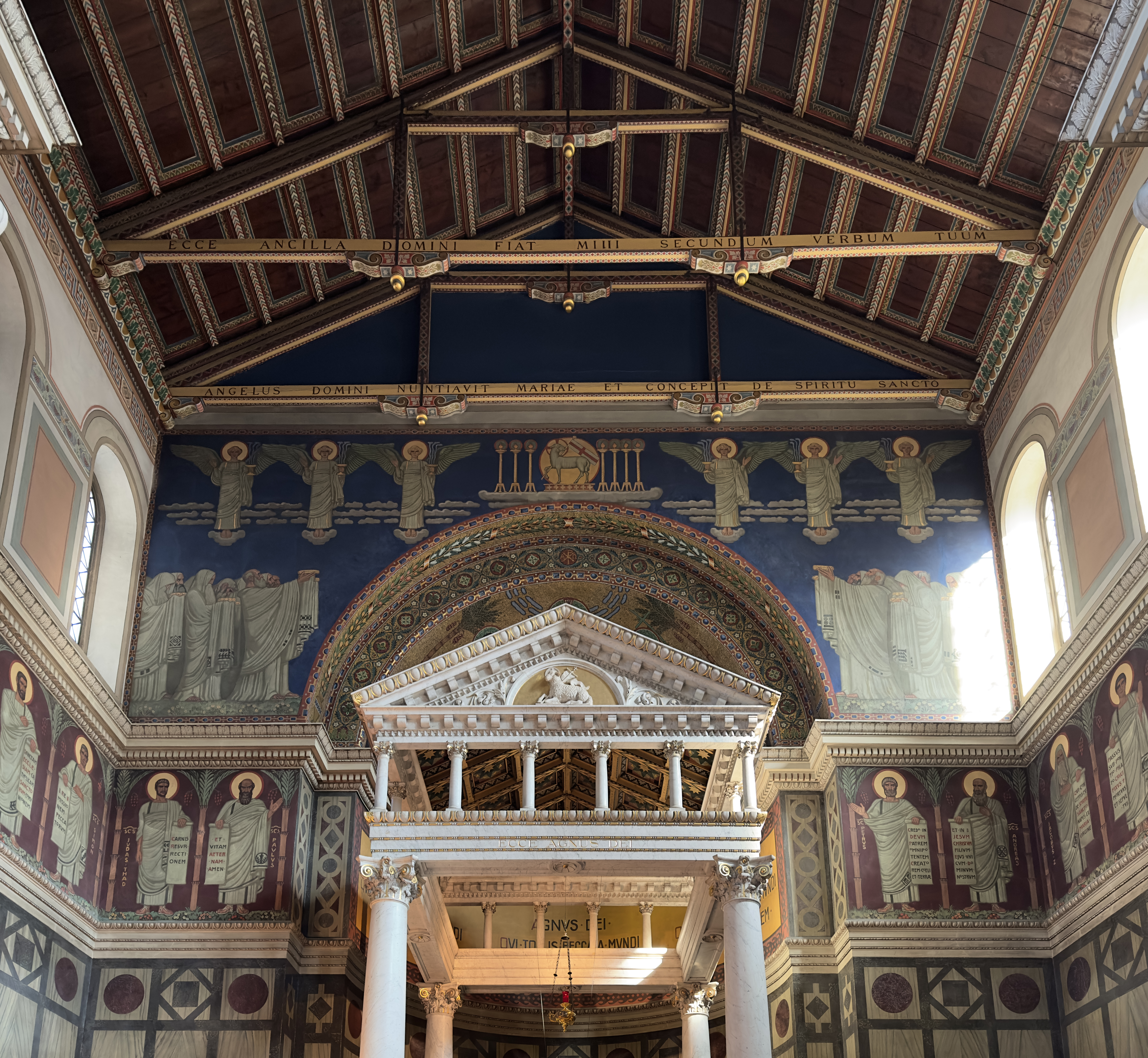
Chancel details

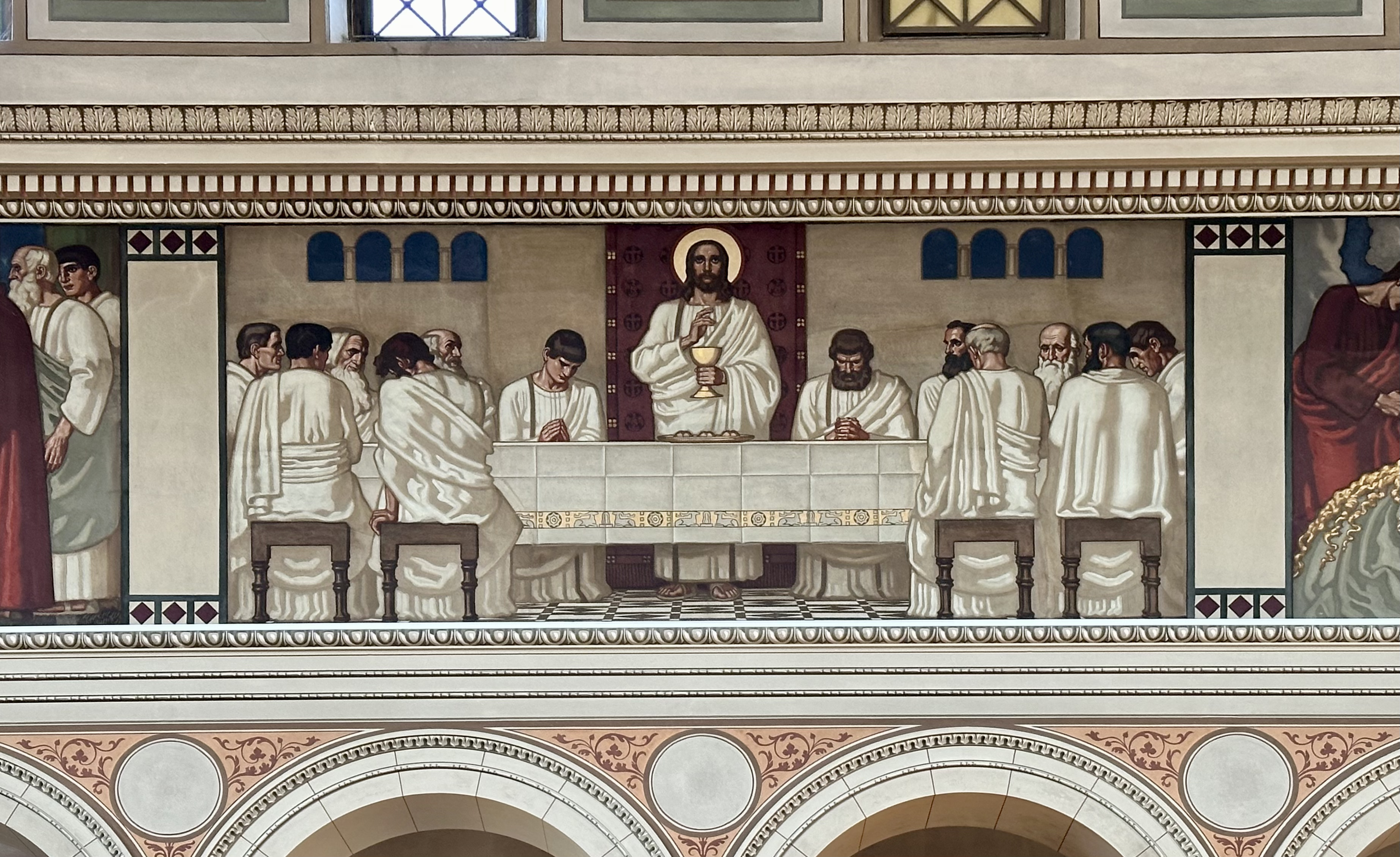
Mural depicting the Last Supper

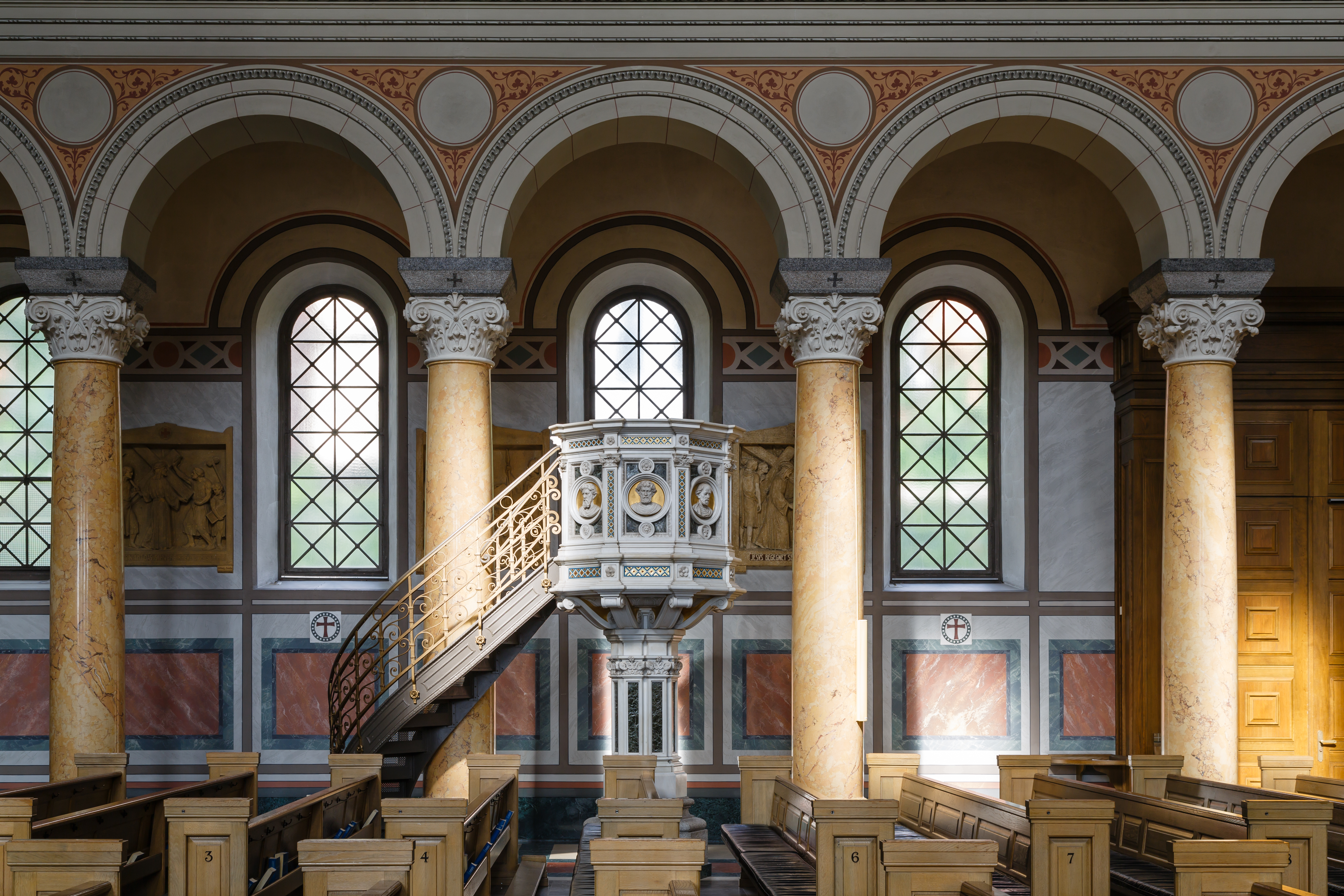
Pulpit in front of columns

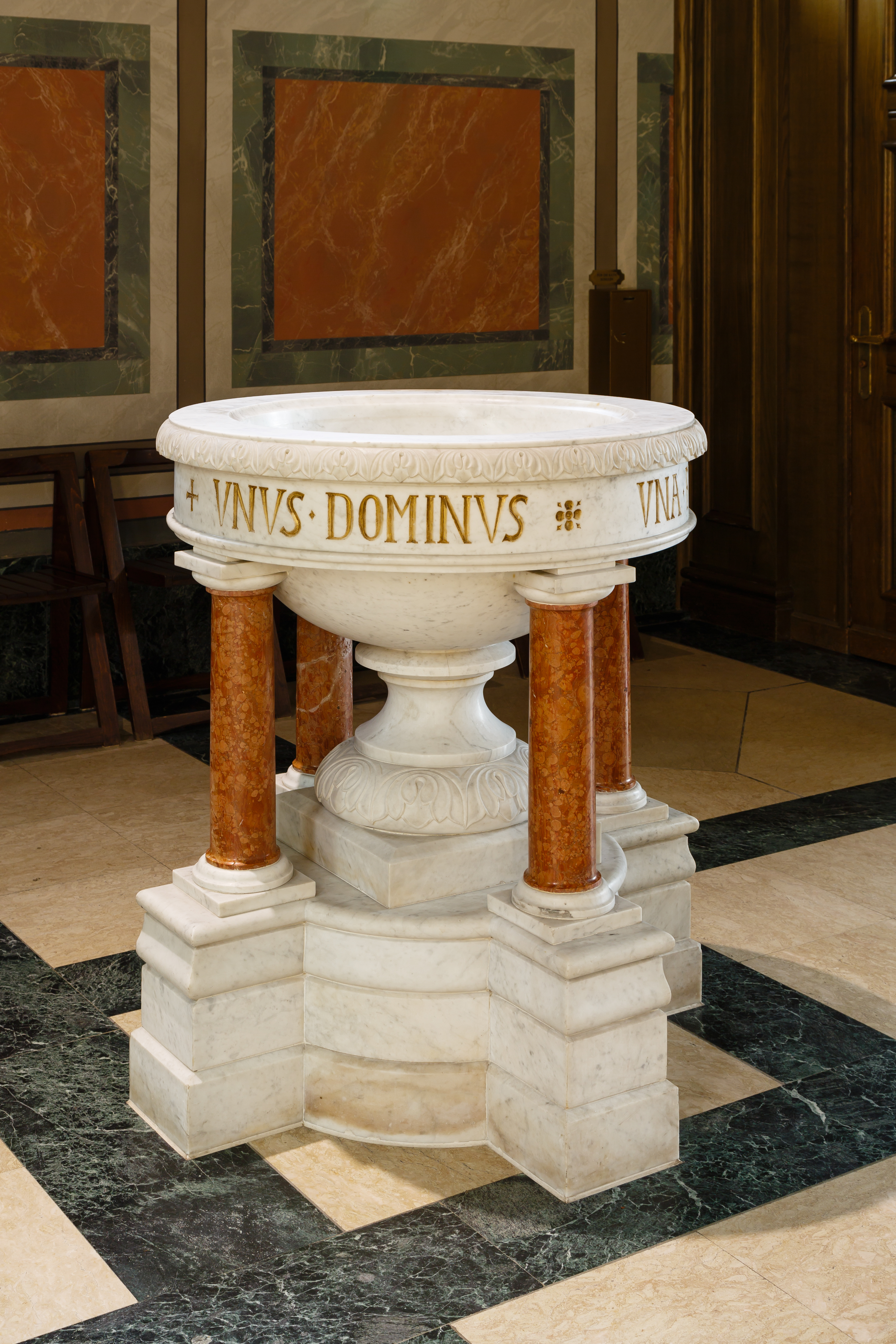
Baptismal font

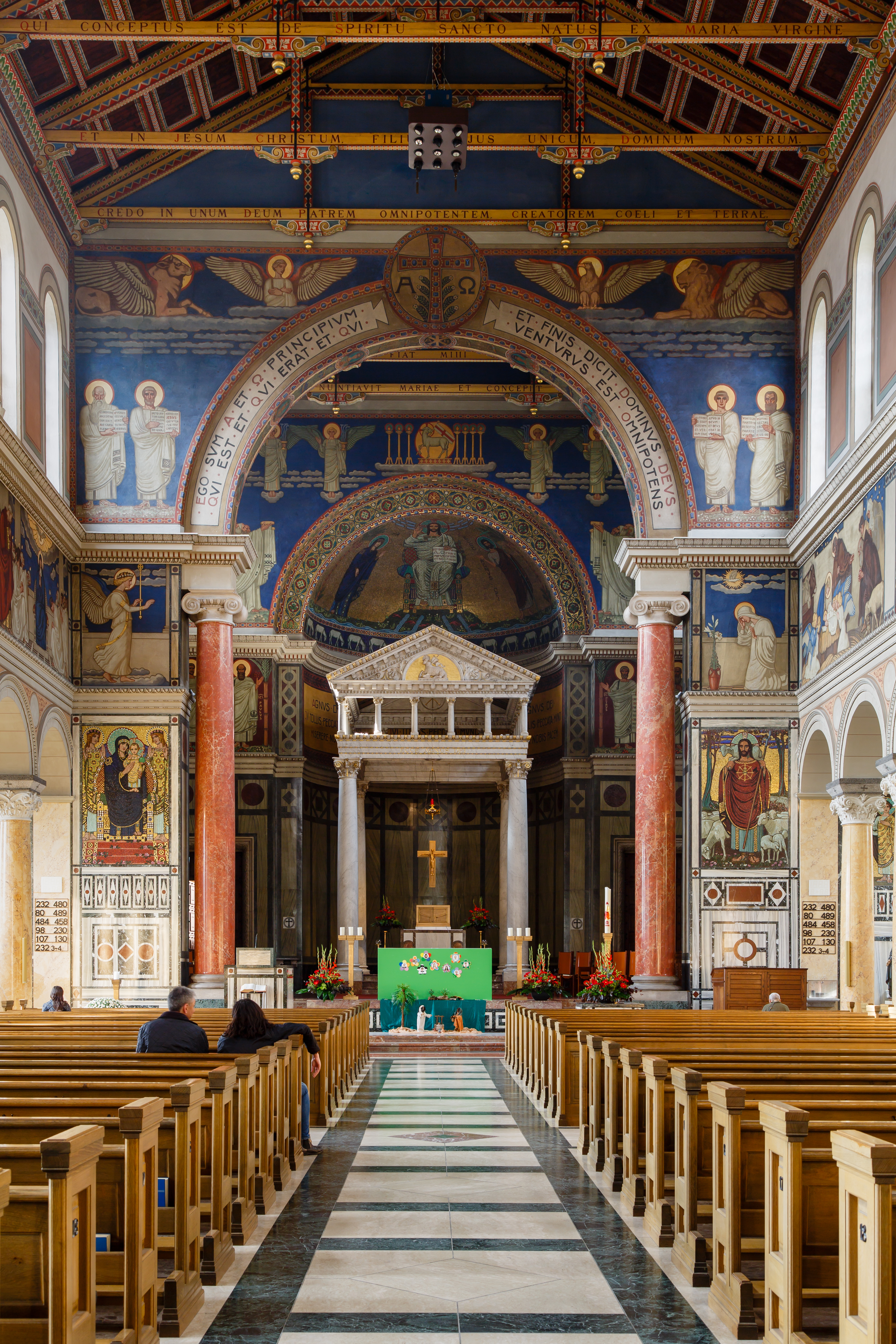
Interior of the church, facing east, showing the truss ceiling and the altar under the ciborium

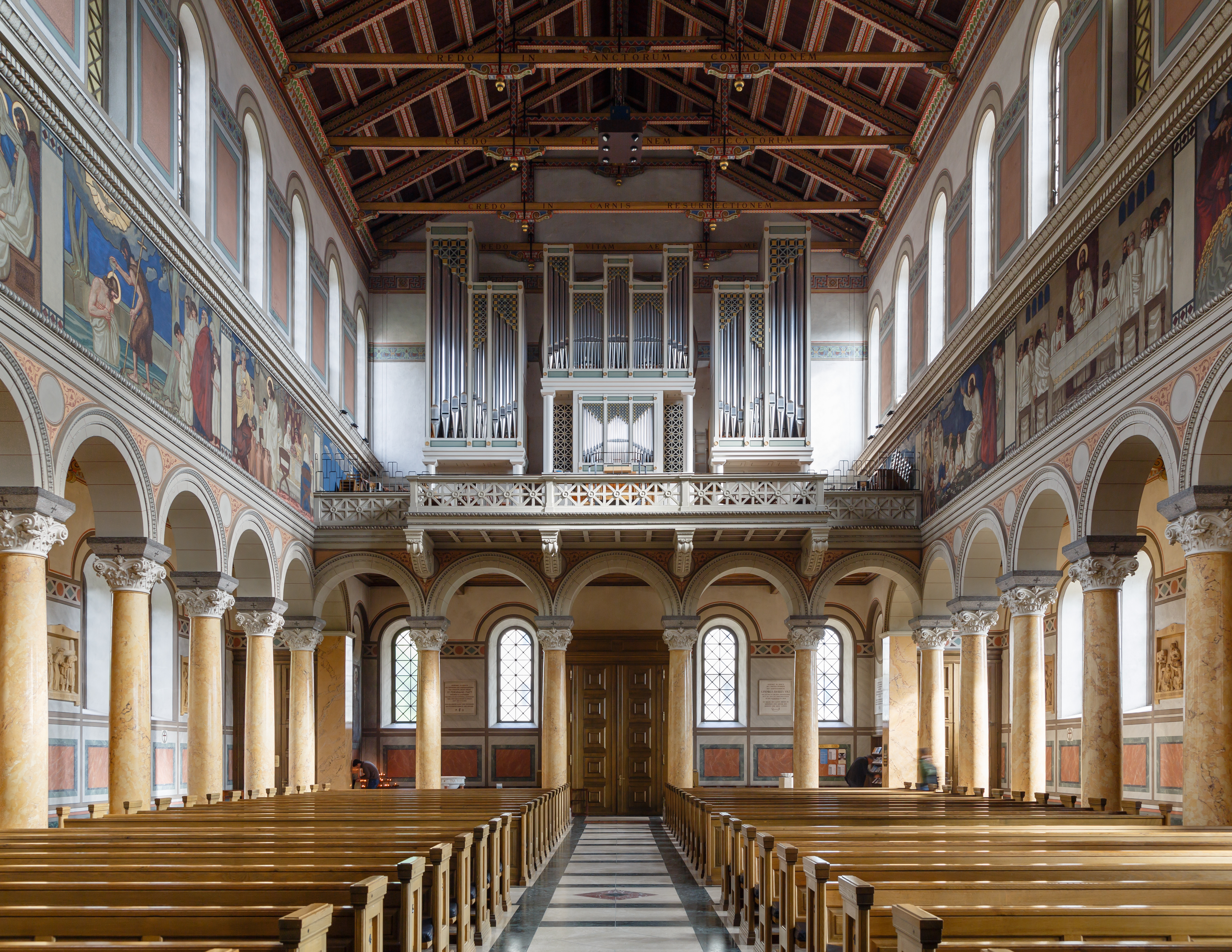
Interior of the church, facing west, showing the murals and the Kuhn organ

== Sources ==
- Fischer, Rainauld (1974). "Hundert Jahre katholischer Kirchenbau" [One Hundred Years of Catholic Church Building]. In Kolb, Guido (ed.). 100 Jahre: St. Peter und Pauls-Kirche [100 Years: Sts. Peter and Paul Church] (in German). Zürich: Katholisches Pfarramt St. Peter und Paul.
- Pescatore, Flurina; Winzeler, Marius (1997). Die katholische Pfarrkirche Liebfrauen in Zürich [The Catholic Parish Church of Liebfrauen in Zurich]. Schweizerische Kunstführer (Swiss Art Guide) (in German). Bern: Gesellschaft für schweizerische Kunstgeschichte (Society for Swiss Art History). ISBN 3-85782-612-6.
- Schönbächler, Robert (2012). "Kirchen und Gotteshäuser der Stadt Zürich" [Churches and Places of Worship in the City of Zurich]. Neujahrsblatt Industriequartier. Aussersihl, Zürich.
- Stadt Zürich, Amt für Städtebau (June 2014), "Liebfrauen", Katholische Kirchen der Stadt Zürich. Bestandesverzeichnis Denkmalpflege der Stadt Zürich [Catholic Churches in the City of Zurich: Inventory of Monument Preservation in the City of Zurich] (PDF) (in German), pp. 70–79
- Wetli, Elias (2001). "Waren die Dreikönige in der Enge?" [Were the Dreikönige Church in Enge?]. Erinnerungszeitung zum 50 Jahrjubiläum [Paper for 50th Anniversary]. Zürich: Pfarrei Dreikönigen.
