= Cenizate =

Coordinates: 39°18′N 1°39′W

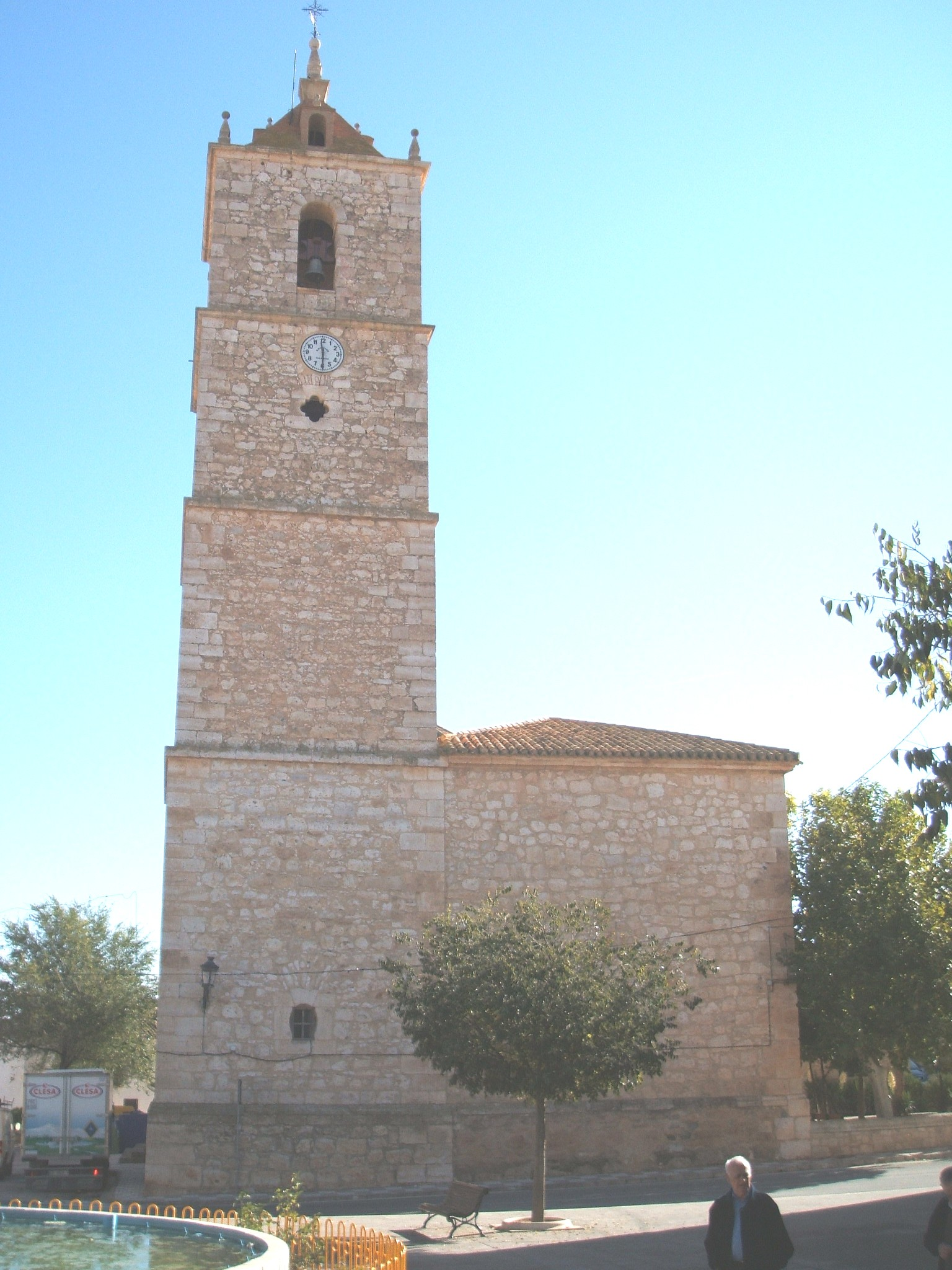

Coat of arms of Cenizate

Cenizate is a municipality in Albacete, Castile-La Mancha, Spain. It has a population of 1,143. The former professional cyclist Roque de la Cruz was born here.

== See also ==
- Church of Nuestra Señora de las Nieves (Cenizate)
