= Melsele =

- Town
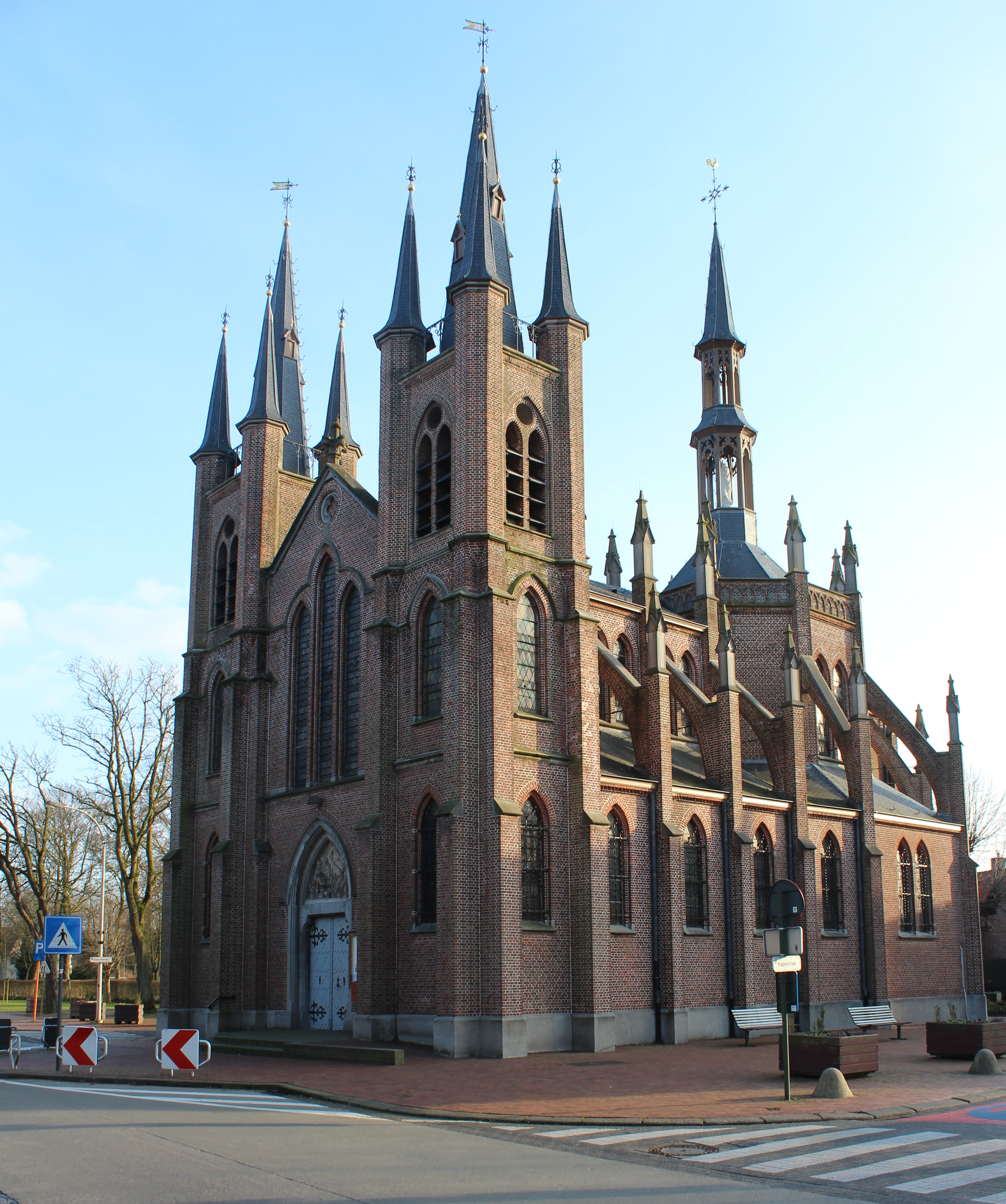
- Our Lady in Gaverland Chapel

- Location in Belgium
- Coordinates: 51.22090°N 4.28152°E
- Country: Belgium
- Region: Flemish Region
- Province: East Flanders
- Municipality: Beveren

Area
  - Total: 18.40 km^{2} (7.10 sq mi)

Population (2021)
  - Total: 11,093
  - Density: 602.9/km^{2} (1,561/sq mi)
- Time zone: CET

Melsele is a town in the Belgian province of East Flanders, between the city of Beveren and the nearby town of Zwijndrecht. Tram route 3 which starts just outside the town connects it to Zwijndrecht and Antwerp. The town's road links include the E17 (France - Antwerp) and the E34 (Knokke-Heist - Antwerp).

== History ==
Melsele is one of the oldest settlements of Waasland. Ceramics and coins have been found from the Roman period. The parish had been established before the year 1000. In 1375, dikes were constructed to protect the polder, however during the 14th and 15th century there were several floods.

The Church of Our Lady was built from 13th to the 17th century, and is a registered heritage site (beschermd erfgoed).

In 1511, a miraculous Madonna statue was discovered under a lime tree near the hamlet Gaverland which from then on became a site of pilgrimage. The Our Lady in Gaverland Chapel was built at the site between 1862 and 1870.

In 1977 the municipality was merged with Beveren as part of the fusion of municipalities in Belgium. It was home to 7,077 people and covered an area of 18.46 square kilometres (7.13 sq mi) prior to the merger.

== Events ==
The Strawberry Festival is held annually five days after the Feast of the Ascension. It was originally conceived by Ivens de Melseelse, the local priest, to promote strawberries. It was a procession to Gaverland offering strawberries. However, after only three years, the festival was cancelled. In 1963, three local sport clubs revived the festival, with a strawberry exhibition, performances and a Miss Strawberry competition.

== Notable people ==
- Roland Verhavert (1927–2014), film director.

== Gallery ==
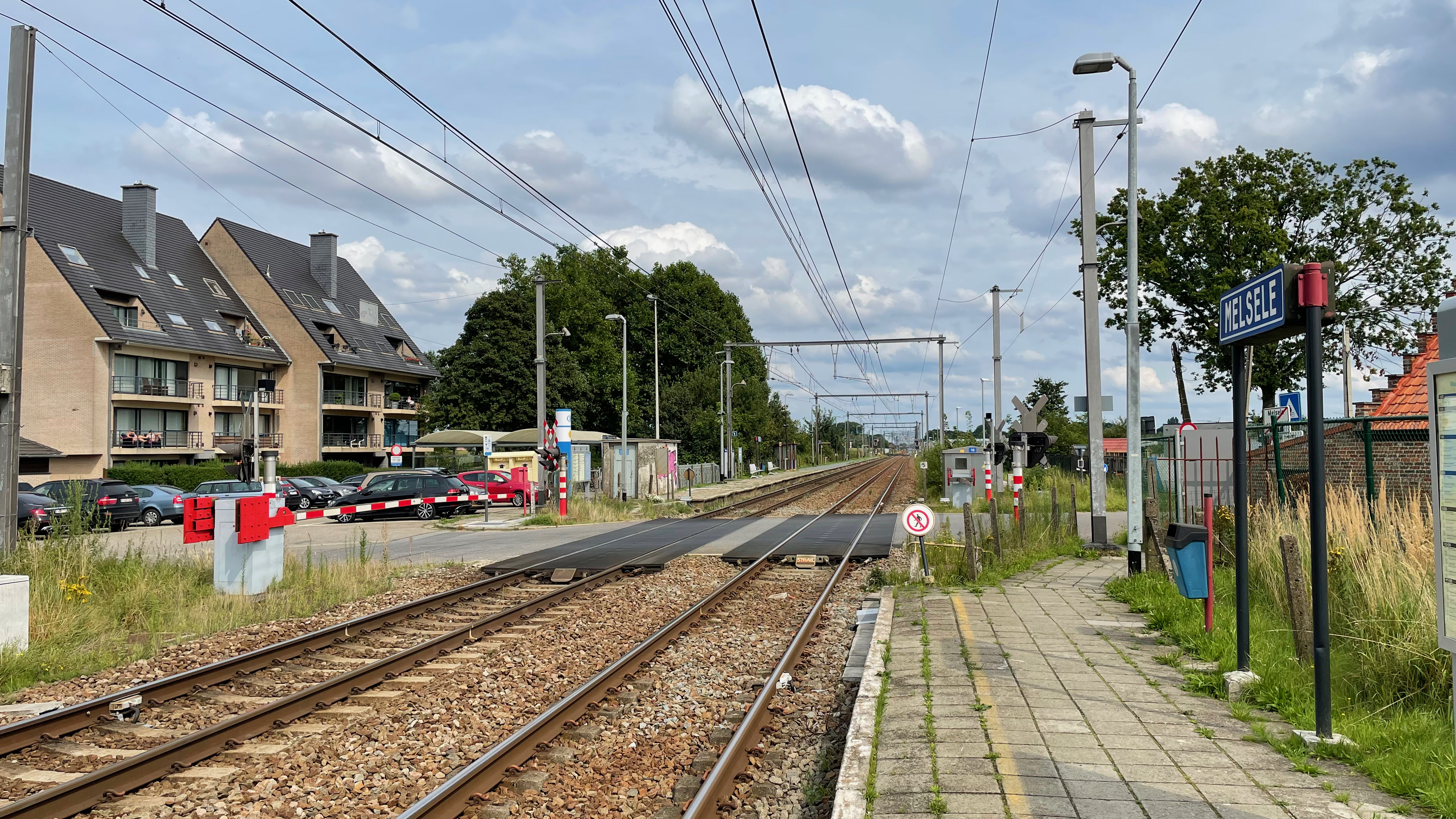
Melsele railway station

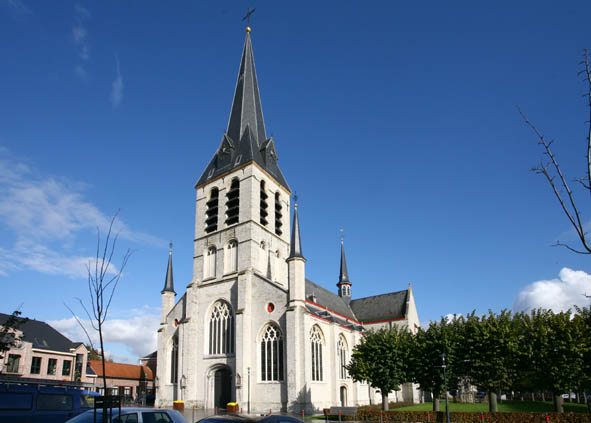
Church of Our Lady, Melsele

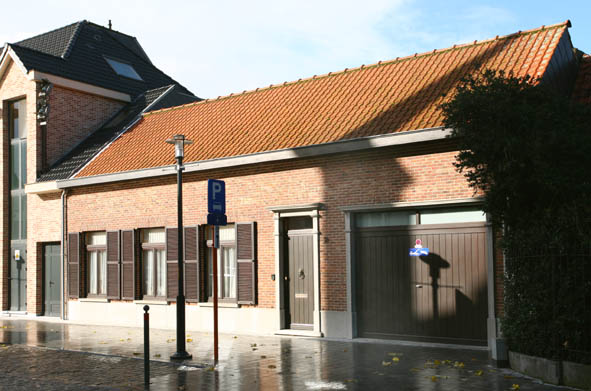
House in Melsele

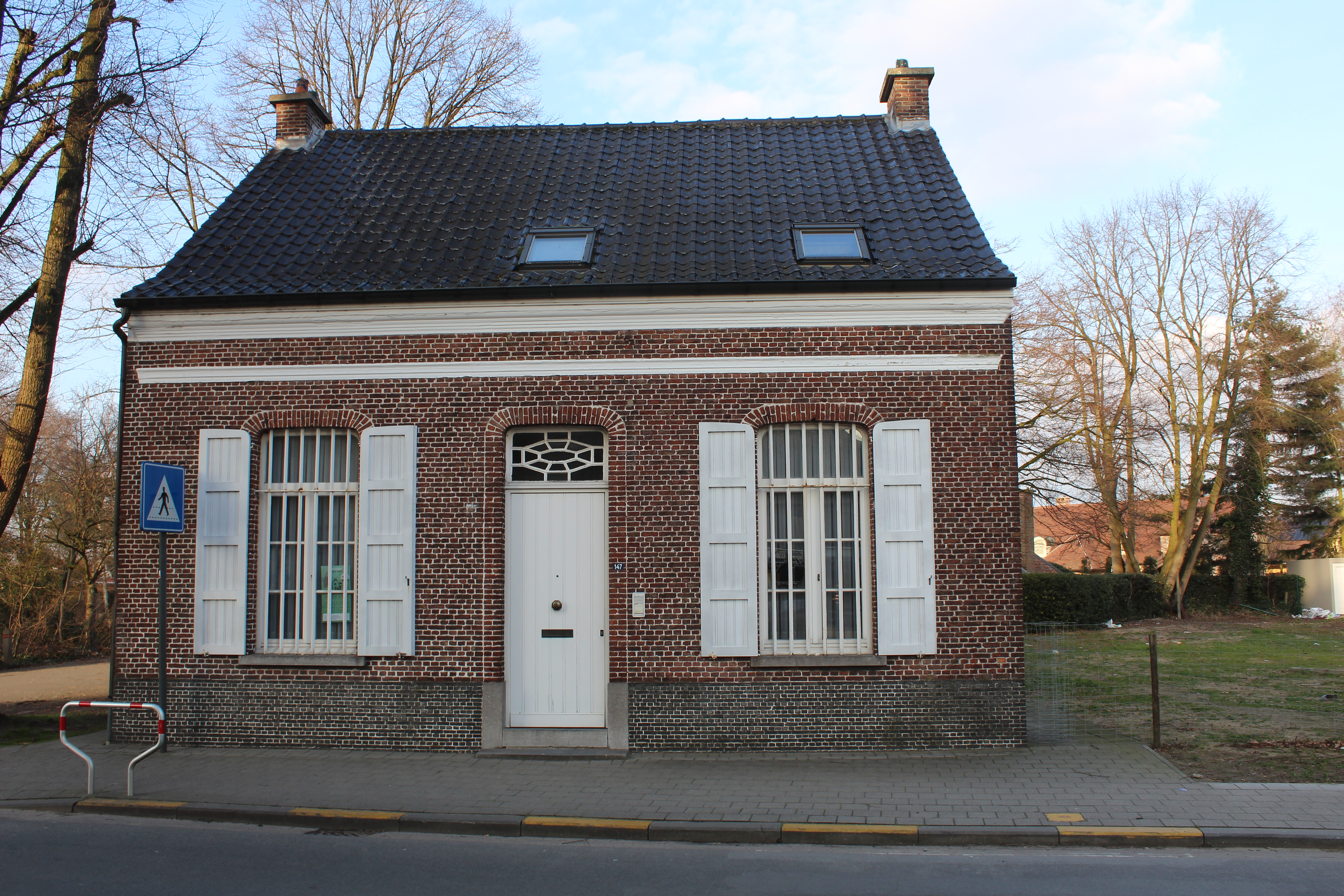
House in Melsele
