= Nuestra Señora de Gracia Parish Church =

Church in Palomas, Spain

Coordinates: 38.6912°N 6.1336°W

Nuestra Señora de Gracia Parish Church Iglesia parroquial de Nuestra Señora de Gracia (in Spanish)
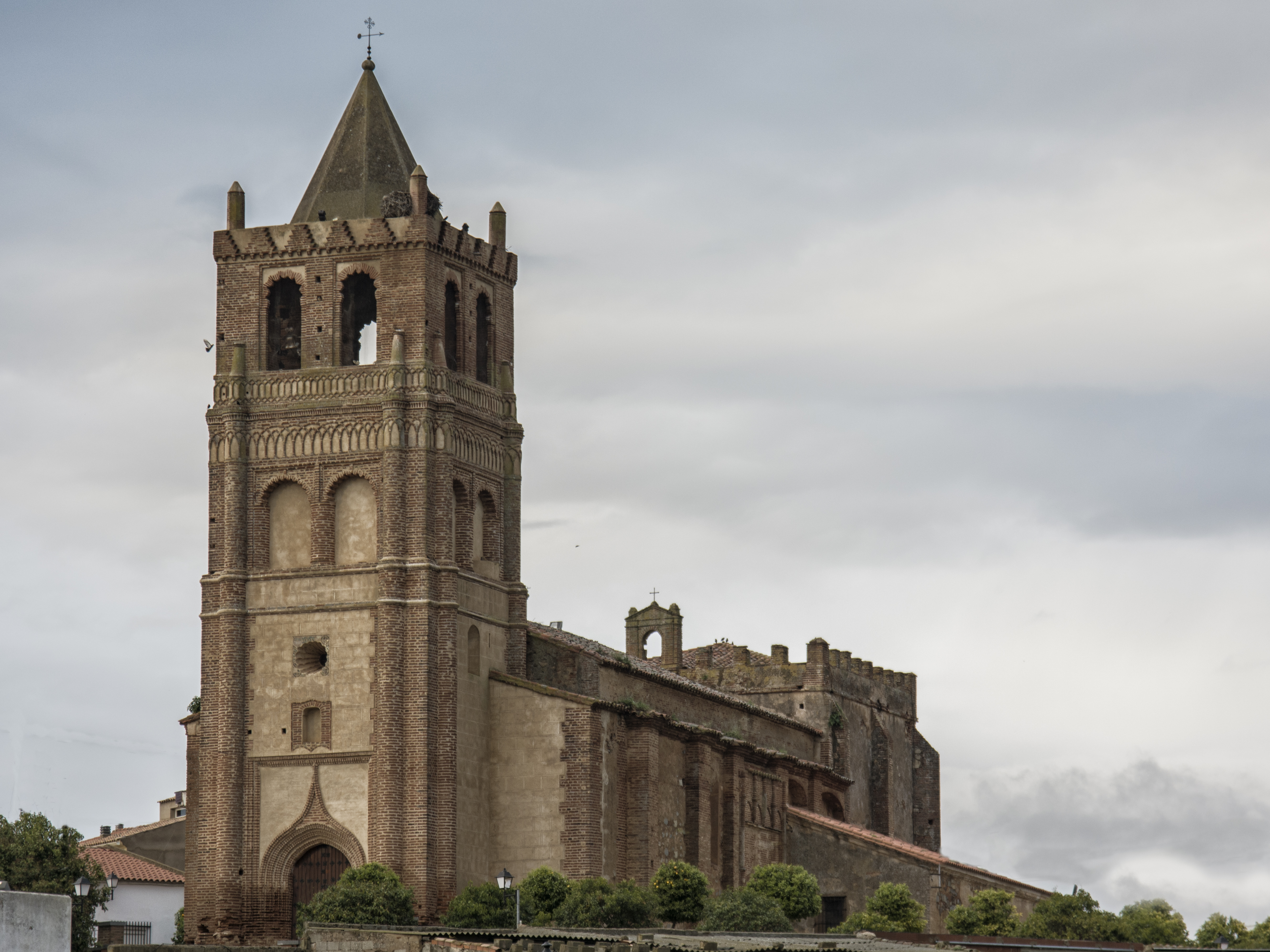

Religion
- Affiliation: Roman Catholic
- Diocese: Palomas
- Province: Badajoz
- Ecclesiastical or organisational status: Parish Church

Location
- Location: Badajoz, Spain
- Interactive map of Nuestra Señora de Gracia Parish Church; Iglesia parroquial de Nuestra Señora de Gracia (in Spanish)

Architecture
- Type: Church
- Style: Gothic
- Spanish Cultural Heritage
- Official name: Iglesia parroquial de Nuestra Señora de Gracia
- Designated: 23 July 1991
- Reference no.: (R.I.)51 - 0005418 - 00000

The Nuestra Señora de Gracia Parish Church (Spanish: Iglesia de Nuestra Señora de Gracia) is a Roman Catholic church in the town of Palomas, Badajoz, Extremadura, western Spain. It was declared Bien de Interés Cultural on 12 November 2013.

== History ==
The Our Lady of Grace church is an architectural monument located at the highest point of the town of Palomas in Badajoz. It is located in the center of a rectangular plaza and is bounded by the Iglesia, Jesús, Tras Iglesia y Juan XXIII streets. Built in the sixteenth century style, it is constructed in the Gothic-Mudéjar style and falls under the Order of Santiago.

Its large tower is the most distinct feature of the monument and one of the most beautiful examples of tower facades in Lower Extremadura. Its geometric decorations are done with moulded brick. Along with the Granja de Torrehermosa and the surrounding Hornachos, Alange and Puebla de la Reina and others, the church is the most outstanding example of the achievements of the Mudéjar style in Lower Extremadura.

The tower was built before 1550. Its body is square and takes up almost the entire nave. The tower is very high and consists of three sections. The two inferior sections are integrated into the temple, the lower section forms the narthex of the church and the other section forms the choir-gallery.

Some interesting artistic elements still survive on the inside of the building. These include the altarpiece and several side altars dedicated to the Our Lady of Mount Carmel, the Nazarene, the Immaculate Conception, Dolorosa or Our Lady of Guadalupe.

The church is located free in the center of a rectangular plaza with its shaft rotated relative to the aforementioned Plaza. A raised platform is constructed around the building along the south facade because of the slope.
