= Frauenkirche =

Frauenkirche (Church of Our Lady) is a common dedication for churches in German-speaking countries, and may refer to:

- Frauenkirche, Dresden, a Protestant church in Dresden, Germany
- Frauenkirche, Munich, the Catholic cathedral in Munich, Germany
- Frauenkirche, Nuremberg, a Catholic church in Nuremberg, Germany

== See also ==
- Church of Our Lady (disambiguation)
- Liebfrauenkirche (disambiguation)
