= People's altar =

Type of altar in Catholic churches

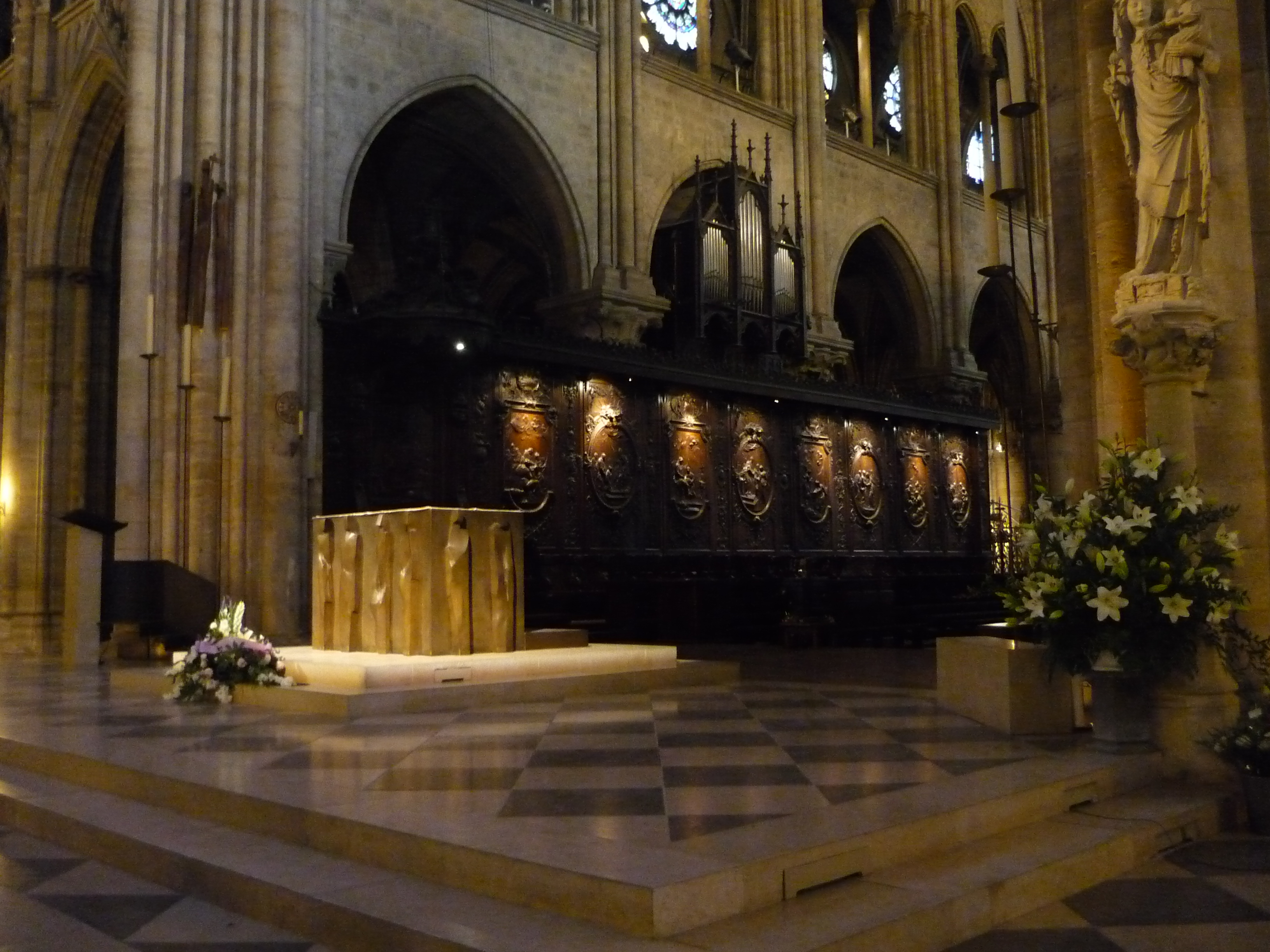
Notre Dame de Paris: Modern people's altar by Jean Touret and Sébastien Touret, built by order of Cardinal Lustiger in 1989

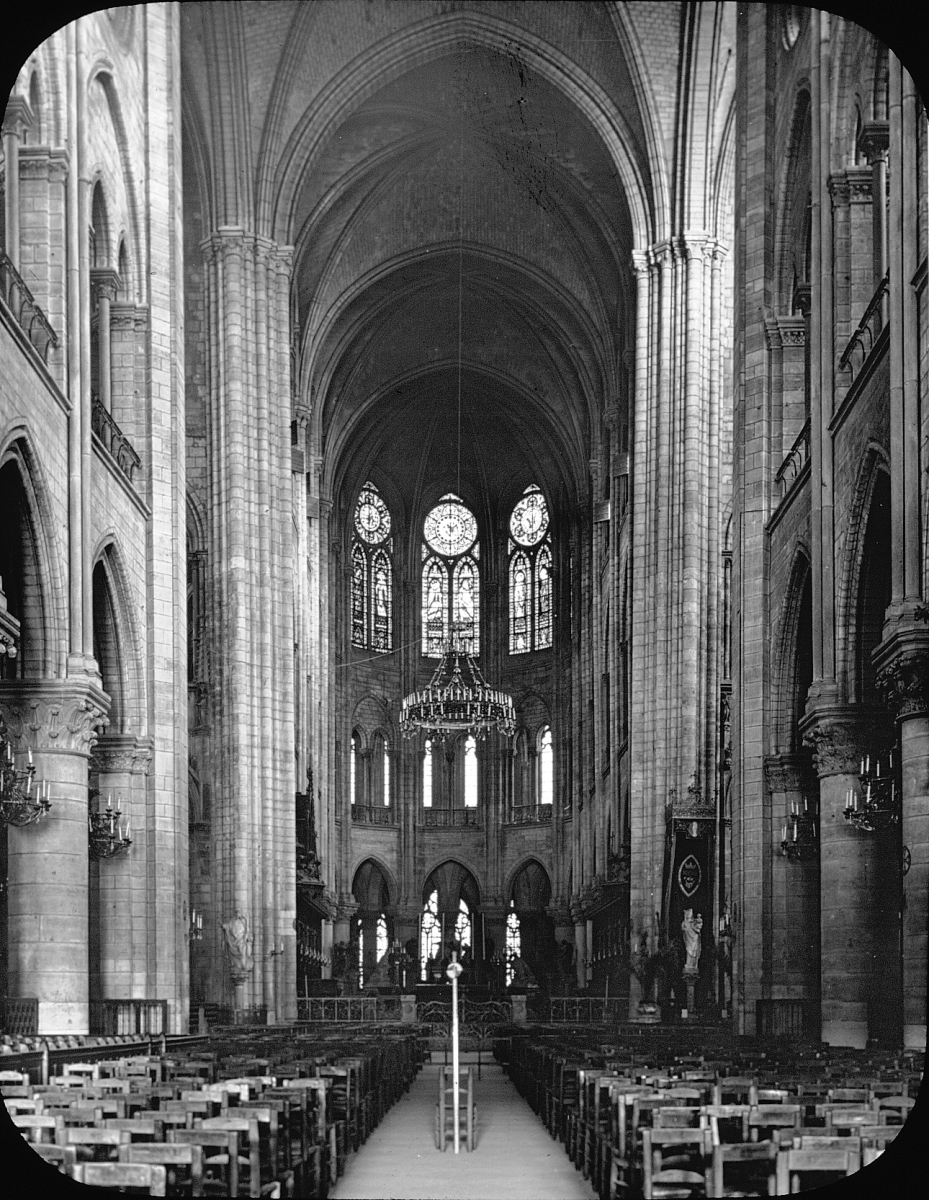
Notre Dame de Paris: Choir and altar rail in 1903 without people's altar

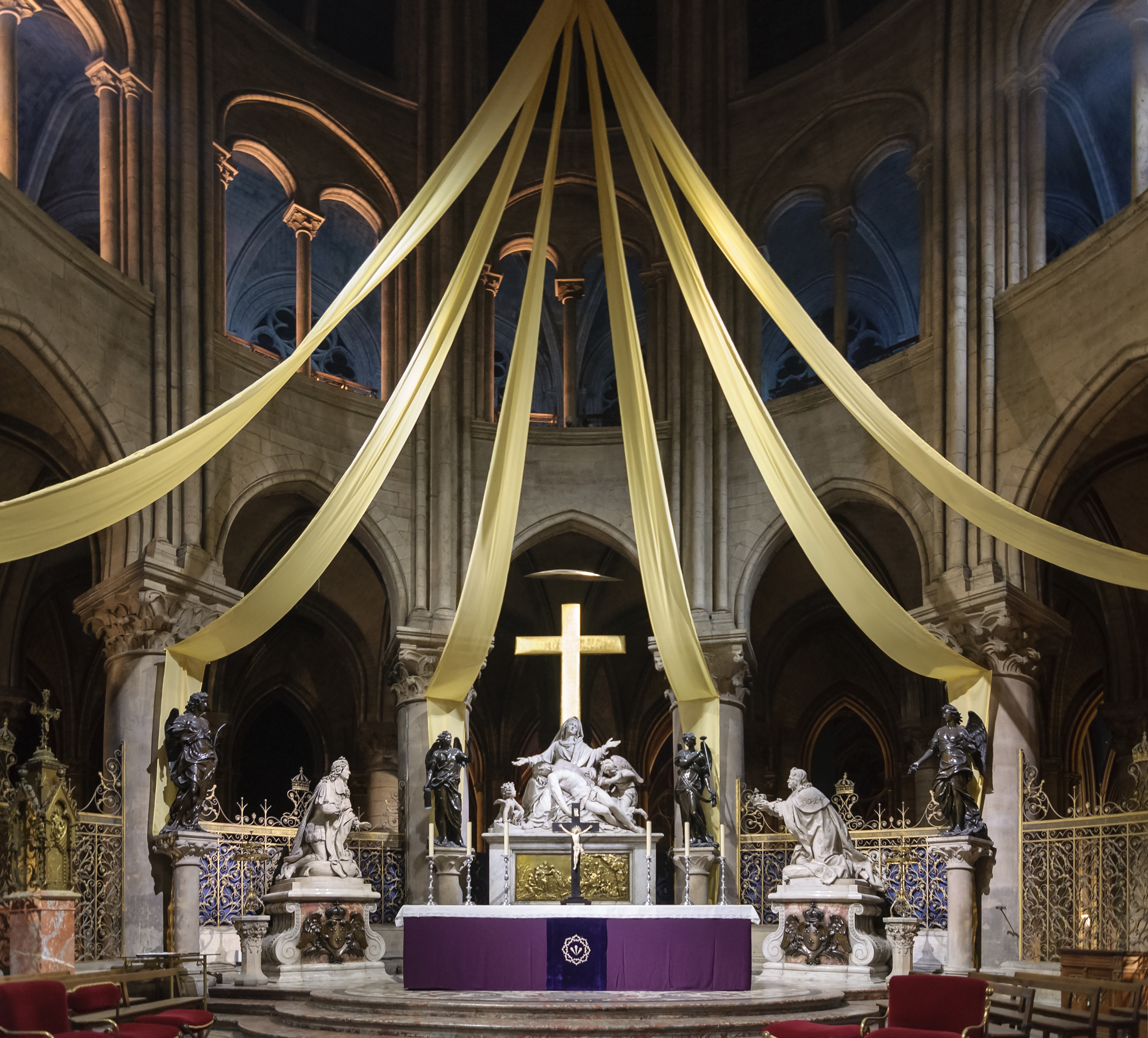
Notre Dame de Paris: Former high altar (Viollet-le-Duc) with pietà (Nicolas Coustou) today

The term people's altar was used to refer to the free-standing altar in Catholic churches, where the priest celebrates the Eucharistic part of Holy Mass turned towards the faithful (versus populum), as opposed to ad orientem (sometimes also called Ad Deum) where the people and the priest face the altar together. That is so that those who join in the celebration can face each other, and so experience themselves as gathered around the altar. The usage of the term has diminished significantly in recent years, and is no longer commonplace in Catholic circles. As a result of the Liturgical Movement in the 19th and early 20th century and the (now sometimes disputed) work of Theodor Klauser and Otto Nußbaum, people's altars where set up especially after the liturgical reform (Inter Oecumenici, No. 91) following the Second Vatican Council and became ″the symbol of the new liturgy″.

Some Catholics consider it as the "center of the thanksgiving that is accomplished through the Eucharist". Such terminology is contrasted with Protestant terms such as “the Lord’s Table”, as opposed to it being for “the people”. If a people's altar is a fixed, consecrated altar, it is regarded as the actual main altar (altar maius, high altar) of the church, even if the high altar, standing against the apsidal wall and formerly used for worship, is still located in the church, for example due to its artistic value. In recent years, it has become an increasing trend where churches are returning to the use of the original altars, and removing later, freestanding altars as part of renovations and restorations of the buildings to restore it to its former beauty, sometimes even installing new "high altars" to replace lost originals.
