= Church of Nuestra Señora de la Esperanza =

- Iglesia Parroquial de Nuestra Señora de la Esperanza (Spanish)
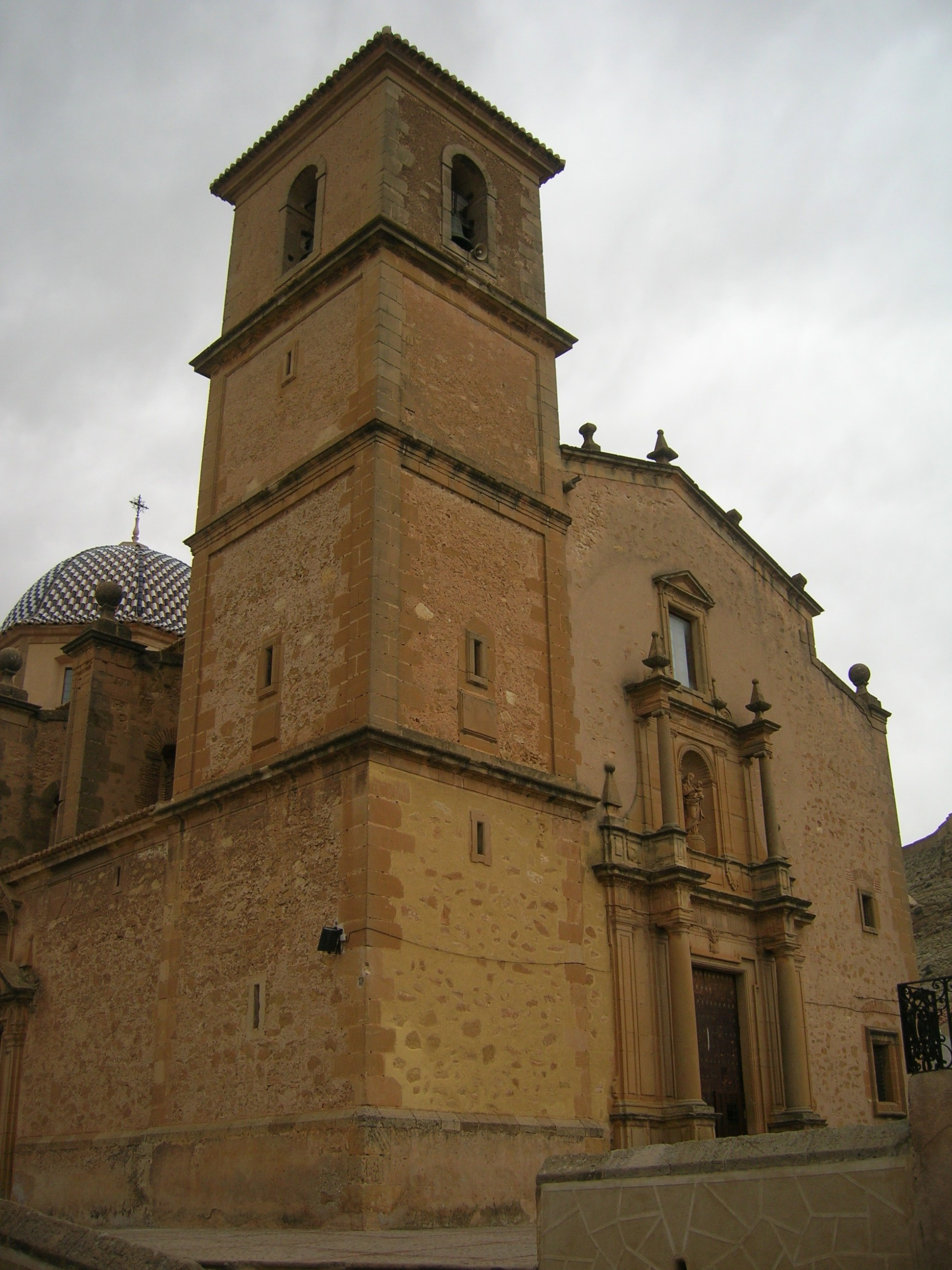

- Location within Spain
- 38.727505°N 2.004115°W
- Location: Peñas de San Pedro, Spain

Spanish Cultural Heritage
- Official name: Iglesia Parroquial de Nuestra Señora de la Esperanza
- Type: Non-movable
- Criteria: Monument
- Designated: 1978
- Reference no.: RI-51-0004305

The Church of Nuestra Señora de la Esperanza (Spanish: Iglesia Parroquial de Nuestra Señora de la Esperanza) is an 18th-century, Roman Catholic parish church located in Peñas de San Pedro, province of Albacete, autonomous community of Castile-La Mancha, Spain.

The church was dedicated to Santa María de la Mayor Esperanza y Santa Librada Mártir. Construction began in 1716 under the maestro mayor Bartolomé de la Cruz Valdés, and the architect Cosme Carreras. The church was consecrated in 1747, but the tower, dome, and chapels were not complete till 1797.

The cupula has spandrels depicting the four Fathers of the Catholic church: saints Augustine, Ambrose, Gregory, and Jerome. Above among the saints are depicted Santas Quiteria and Librada and the archangels Michael, Raphael, and Gabriel. The lunettes of the presbytery depict St Thomas Villanova and San Fulgencio. The main portal is carved in baroque style and completed in 1740s.

The interior has a number of carved wooden polychrome statues mainly by Juan de Gea and Ignacio Castell. The main retablo was also designed and carved by these artists, and gilded by Francisco and Gregorio Sánchez, with paintings with stories of the New Testament by Bautista Suñer.

It was declared Bien de Interés Cultural in 1978.
