= Church of Nuestra Señora de las Nieves (Cenizate) =

- Iglesia Parroquial de Nuestra Señora de las Nieves (Spanish)
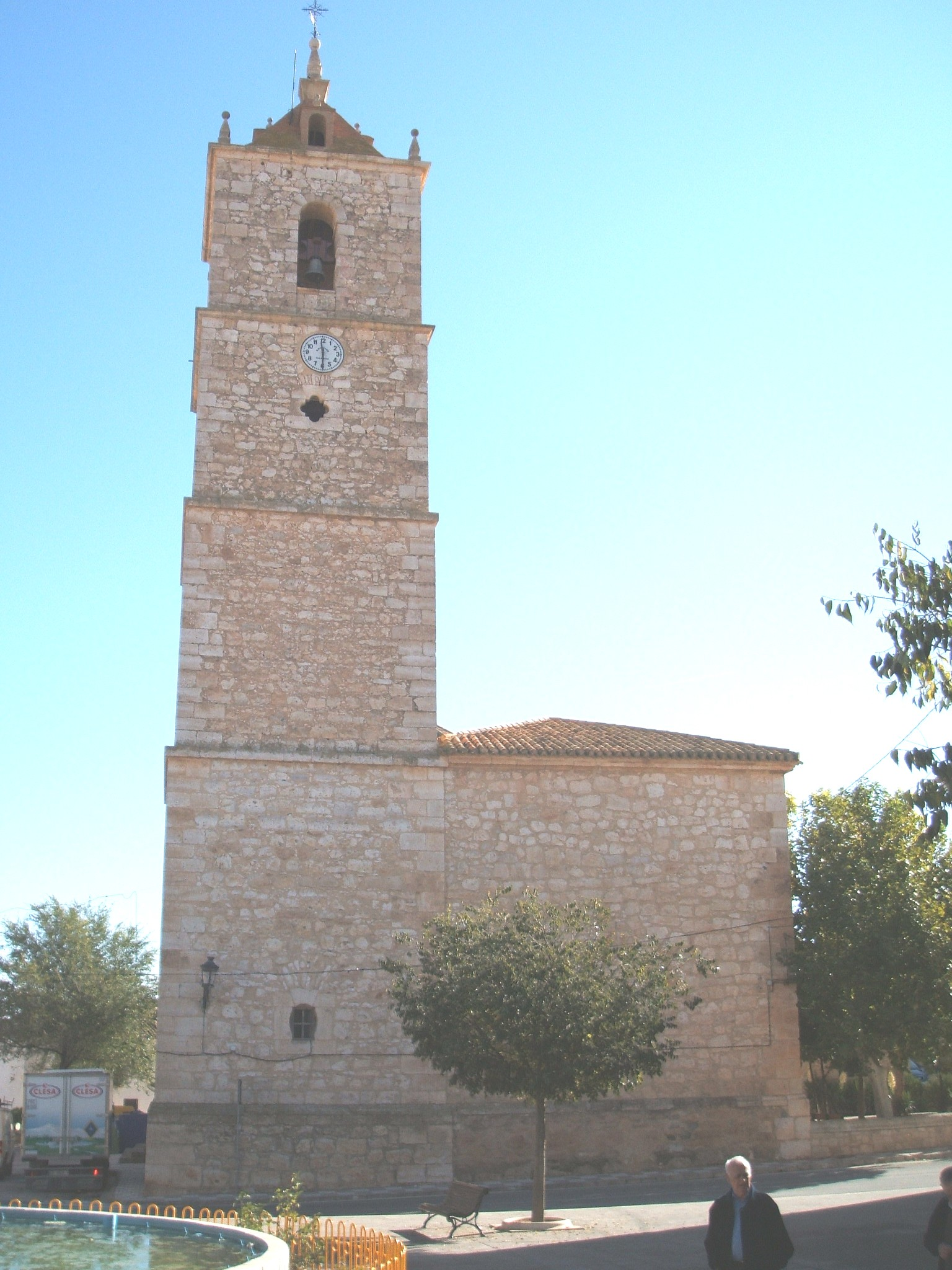

- Location within Spain
- 39.303927°N 1.660889°W
- Location: Cenizate, Spain

Spanish Cultural Heritage
- Official name: Iglesia Parroquial de Nuestra Señora de las Nieves
- Type: Non-movable
- Criteria: Monument
- Designated: 1991
- Reference no.: RI-51-0007074

The Church of Nuestra Señora de las Nieves (Spanish: Iglesia Parroquial de Nuestra Señora de las Nieves) is a church located in Cenizate, Spain. The church was constructed mainly in the 18th century. It was declared Bien de Interés Cultural ("good of cultural interest") in 1991.
