= Nuestra Señora de Loreto Church =

Church building in Mexico City, Mexico

Coordinates: 19°26′10.69″N 99°7′39.52″W

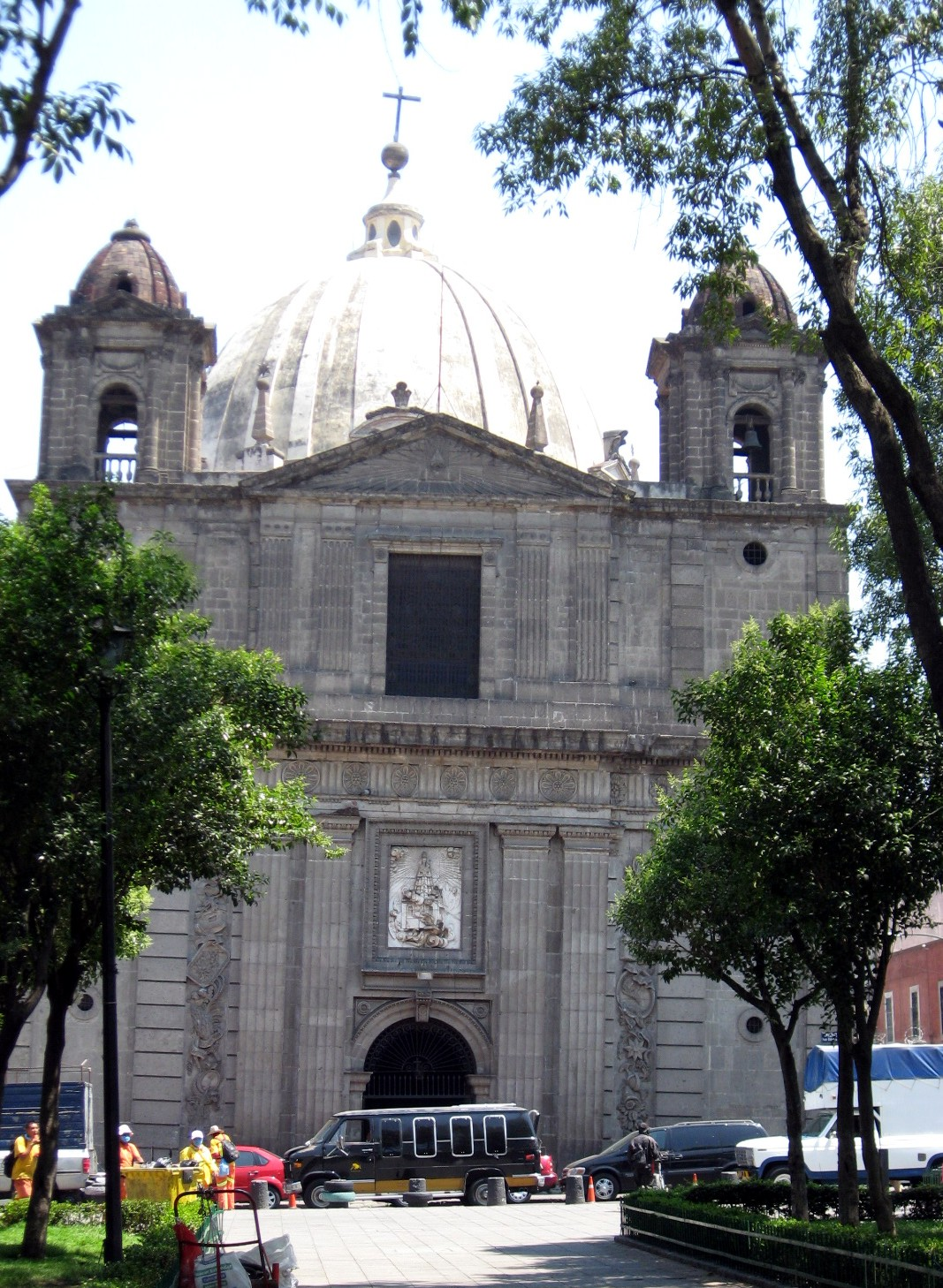
- Nuestra Señora de Loreto Church
- Location: Mexico City
- Country: Mexico
- Denomination: Roman Catholic

Architecture
- Architectural type: Neoclassical
- Years built: 1806-1819
- Completed: 1819

The Nuestra Señora de Loreto (Our Lady of Loreto) Church in the historic center of Mexico City was the last major church constructed during the colonial period. Constructed between 1806 and 1819, the church tilts significantly to one side due to being constructed of stone of two different weights. Loreto is one of a number of churches in the historic district that the Archdiocese of Mexico says is in imminent danger of being lost due to structural damage from the uneven sinking. In front of the church is a plaza named after the church which used to be the site of Mexico City's first synagogue.

== The church ==
=== History ===
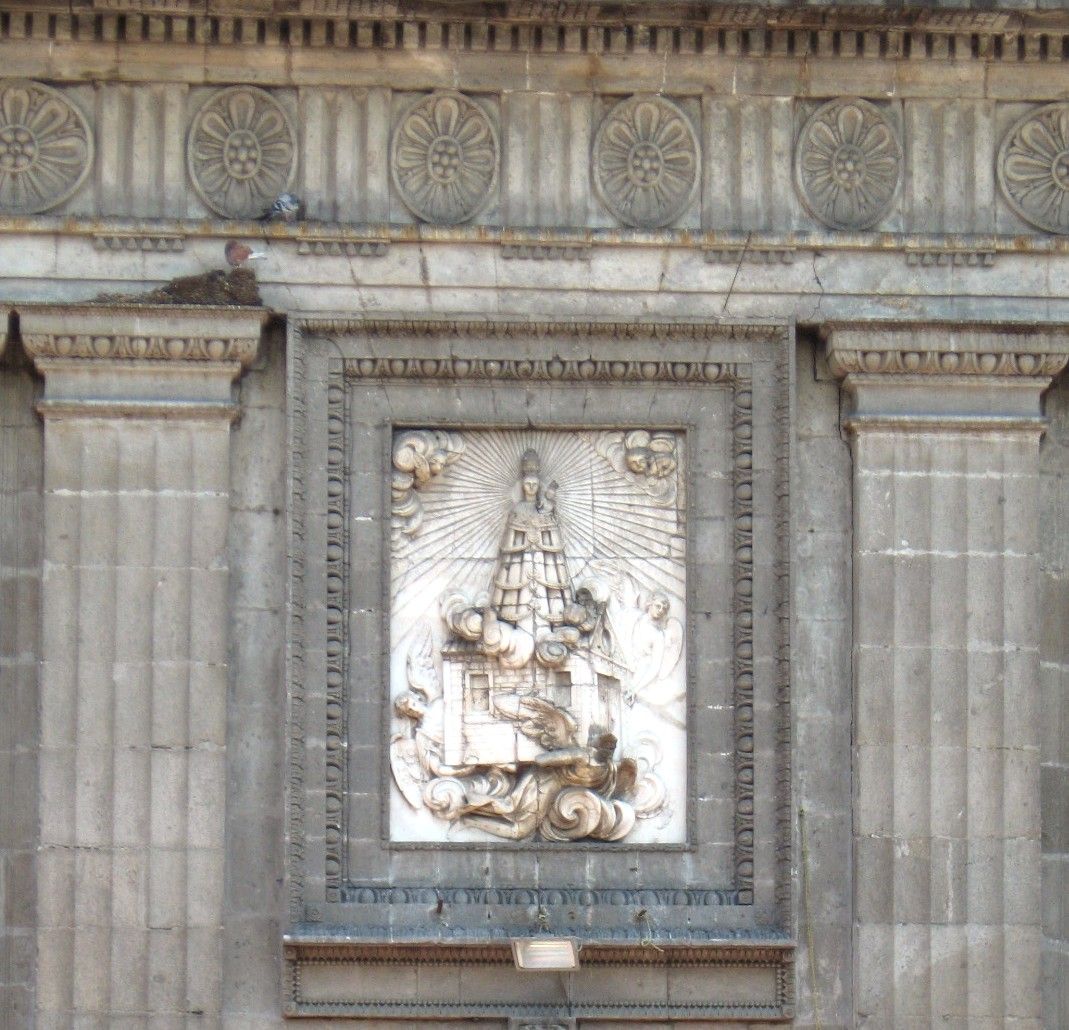
relief of Our Lady of Loreto

At the beginning of the 19th century, the Count of Bassoco decided to build a church dedicated to the Our Lady of Loreto, whose image was originally housed in the nearby Jesuit college of San Gregorio. After the Jesuits were expelled from Spanish dominions, this image was moved from San Gregorio to the Convent of La Encarnación. The site originally was a chapel used as a used as a baptistery for the Church of San Pedro y San Pablo in 1680. Although Manuel Tolsá submitted designs for the church, artists Ignacio Castera and Agustin Paz designed and directed the work and was built in three stages. The first stone was laid in 1809, and the church was consecrated on 21 August 1816. It would end up being the last church built during colonial times due to the Mexican War of Independence, which ended in 1821. When it was finished, the image of Our Lady of Loreto was retrieved from La Encarnación and placed here. It was placed in the hands of the Jesuits. However, there was an error with design of this church. One side was built with solid, heavy stone, but the other was built with tezontle, a light, porous volcanic stone. This has caused the church to lean towards its east side. By 1832, the church had sunk so that authorities feared its imminent collapse and ordered it closed, and the image of Our Lady of Loreto was moved to the San Pedro y San Pablo Church. After a few years, in 1850, it was decided that the church was safe enough to open again, and the image once again returned home. Despite the tilting and some serious structural problems, the two sections have remained intact since the church was built. On July 15, 1909, P. Wilfrido on behalf of the Congregation of the Sacred Hearts of Jesus and Mary, took possession of the Temple of our Lady of Loreto. At 6:00 a.m. the first mass was celebrated by Fr. Wilfrido.

=== Description ===
Loreto is one of the few churches in Mexico City that shows very strong Neoclassic design throughout, even though its basic layout is still Baroque. This is because the Neoclassic had just begun to be in fashion in Mexico in the early 19th century, and Independence would put an end to major church-building in the capital.

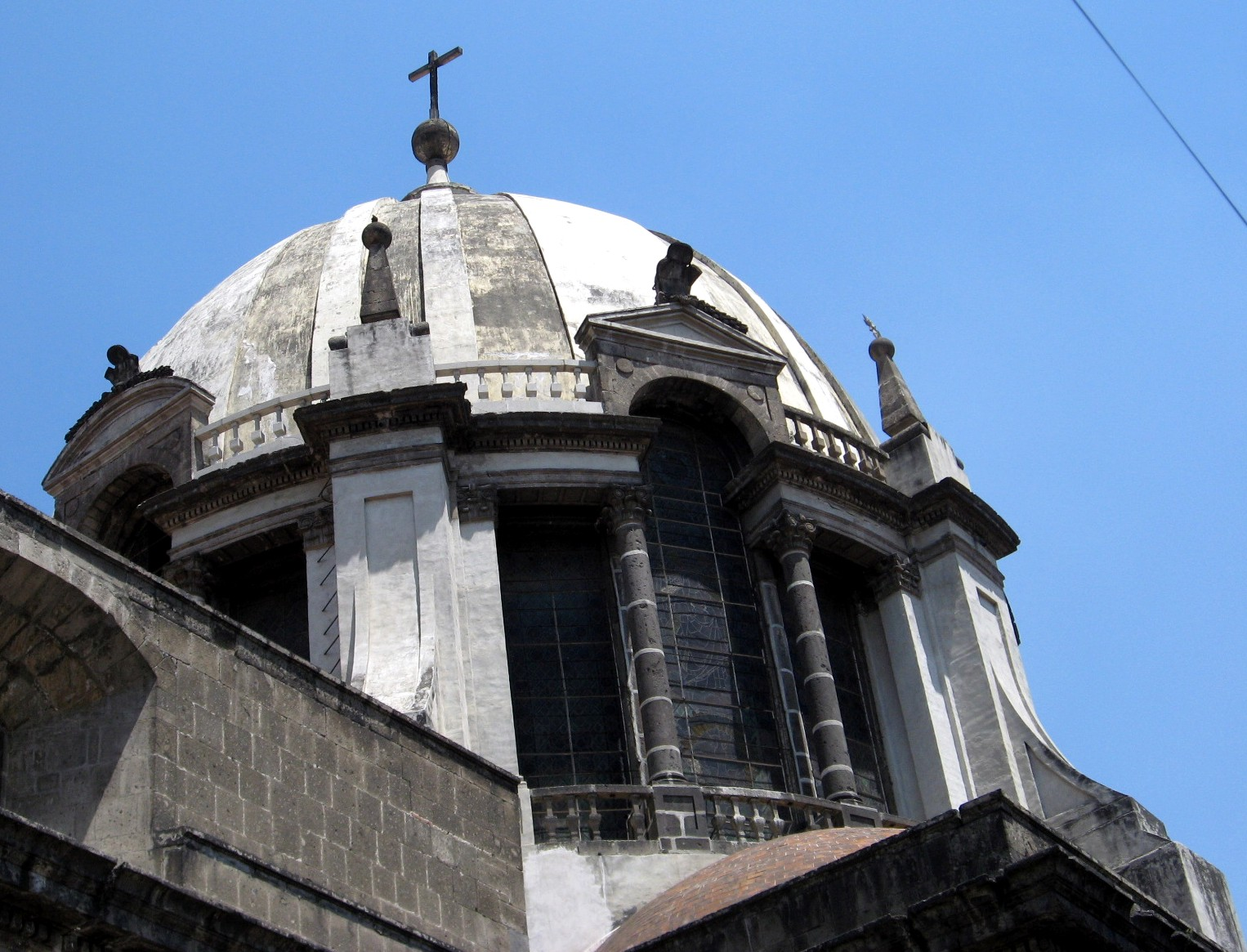
Dome of the church

Its major feature is the exceptional size of its dome, the largest built in Mexico City during the colonial period. The dome allows for a cupola that measures 30 meters wide and 15 meters high. The side of this dome requires the church to have large, thick walls and buttresses to support its weight. In Neoclassic style, the towers reproduce the main lines of the body of the church and the small pediments, lanterns, ribs and cross all adhere to the lines of the great dome.

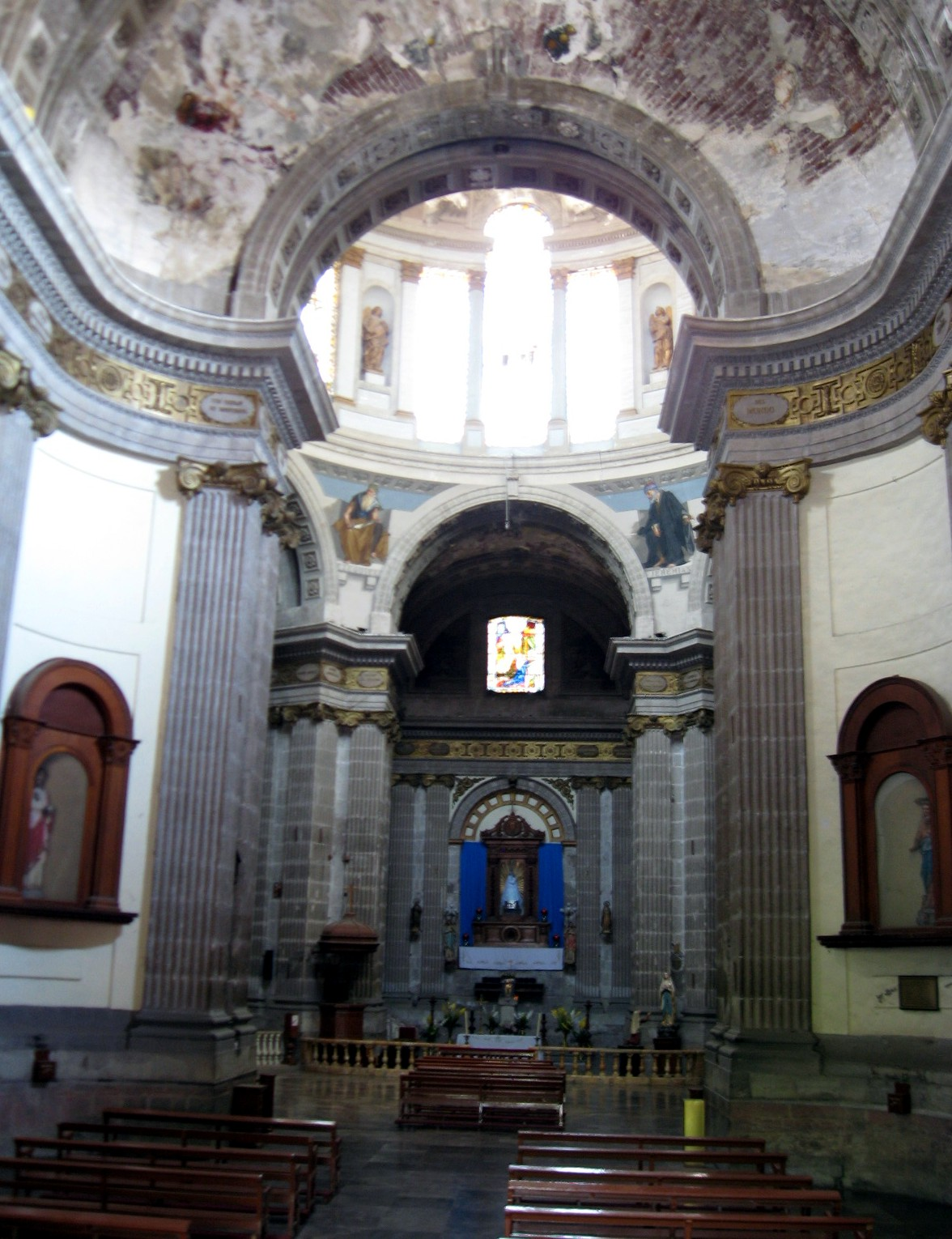
View of rotunda from nave

Inside the central nave is large, too, measuring 2,800 meters squared and 30 meters high" At the back of this nave is a rotunda, illuminated by windows in the cupola. However, this light does not reach the vestibule. One major difference with the inside of this church is that there is no main altarpiece in the rotunda area. Another noticeable “feature” is that the ceiling of both the cupola and the nave are almost completely bare of decoration, as almost all of it has deteriorated due to humidity and cracking from the structure's uneven settling.

=== Deterioration of the church ===
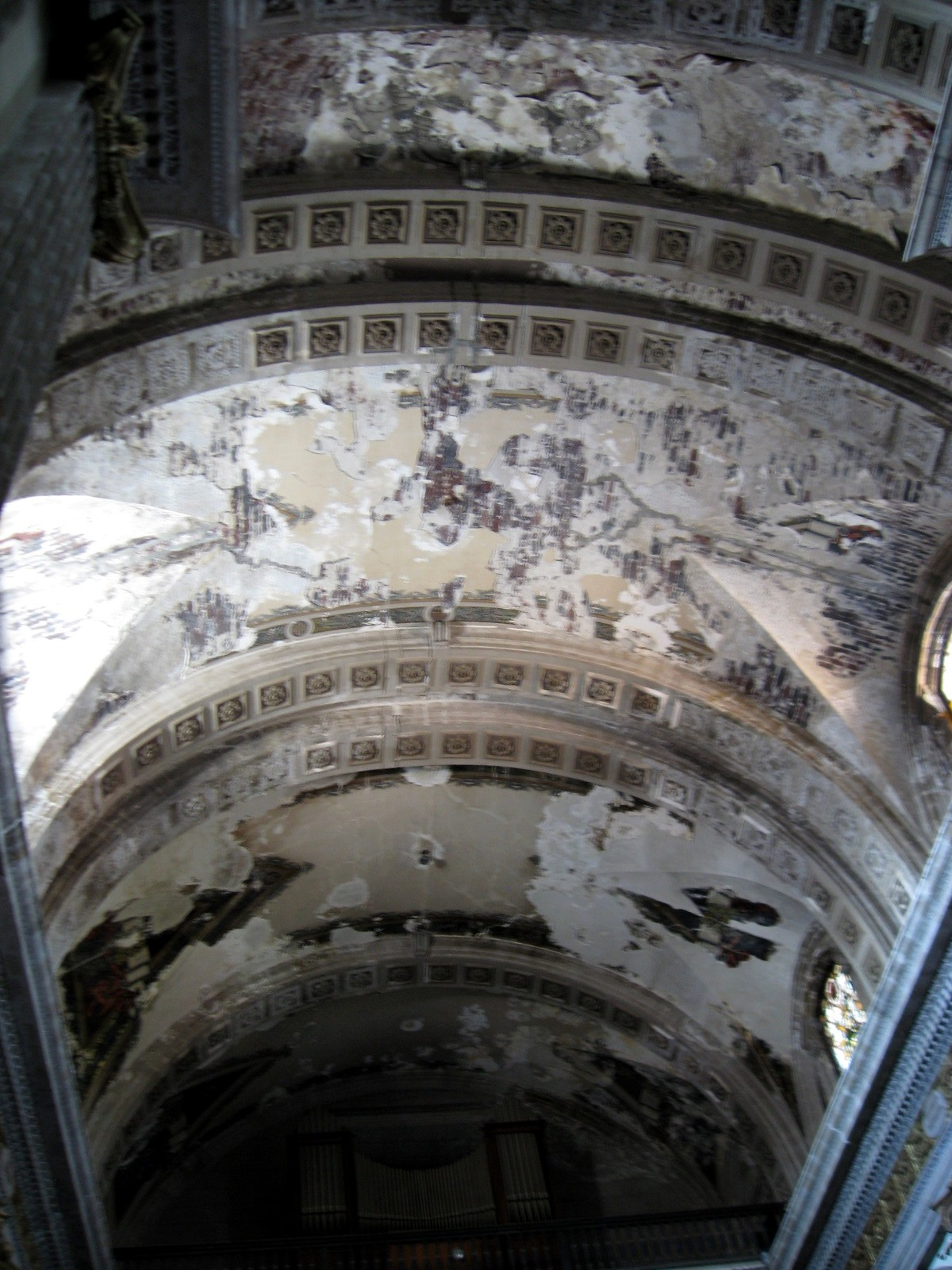
Ceiling of nave show damage

The major threat to the survival of the church is the cracking and stress on the structure because of its uneven sinking into the ground. It is one of a number of religious structures that the Archdiocese says is in imminent danger of collapse and is a danger to visitors. Recently, a large window fell from the high ceiling of the church and almost hit a family. Cracks have been appearing in the walls and the cupola is showing signs of damage. A large crack in the central nave was repaired in 1995, but nothing has been done to try to correct the serious tilting of this church.

The other most notable sign of disrepair is the state of the paintings on the ceilings. Almost all the frescos here are gone. The cupola was sealed against rain in 1995, and an attempt to revitalize the paintings of the church was done in 2001, spending a million pesos, but the artwork here still remains in very poor condition. The primary problem is the passage of time and the lack of maintenance. What is left of the 200-year-old frescos is flaking off. Dust, paint flecks and pieces of plaster are swept from the church's floor every morning. The Archdiocese claims that it does not have to money to repair the damage. The federal government has interest in preserving the structure due to its historic value, but since it is still an active religious institution, the Loreto Church cannot receive federal funds from agencies such as INAH.

== The plaza ==
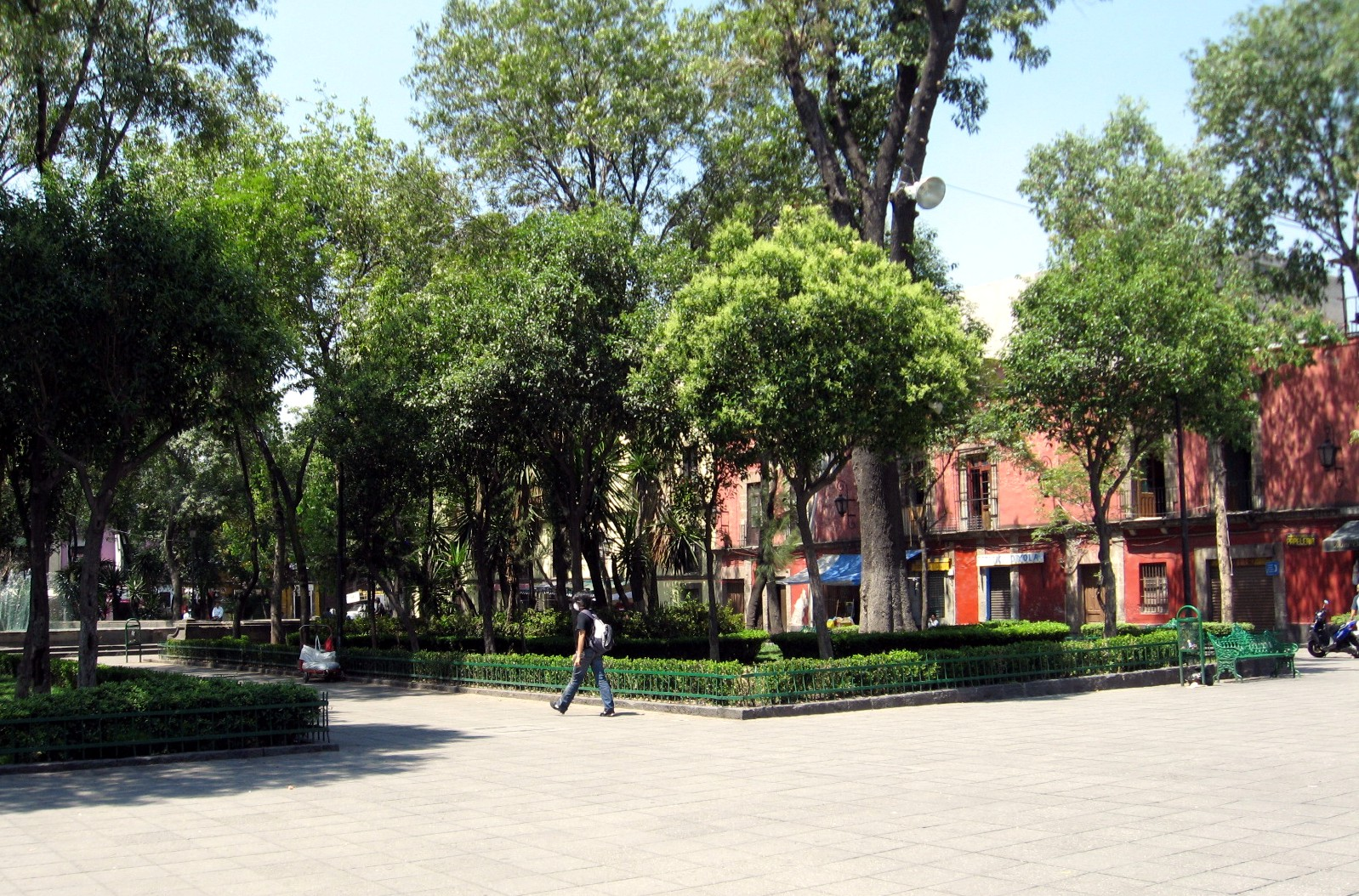
View of plaza from north east corner

The plaza in front of the church is also called “Loreto” and is surrounded by Justo Sierra, Mixcalco, San Ildefonso and San Antonio Tomatlán Streets. Its origins date back to a plan drawn up between 1556 and 1562 for the area attributed to Alonso de Santa Cruz. However, there was little construction here and much of the area was used to dump garbage until the beginning of the 18th century, when a group of Carmelite nuns decided to build what became the Santa Teresa la Nueva convent. The plaza's initial name was Plaza Santa Teresa. Establishment of the convent led to the cleaning up of the area, which led to the construction of homes here. Some of these were built between 1739 and 1742 by architect José Eduardo de Herrera on the west side of the plaza. He also defined two of the plaza's corners by putting niches and crosses on them.

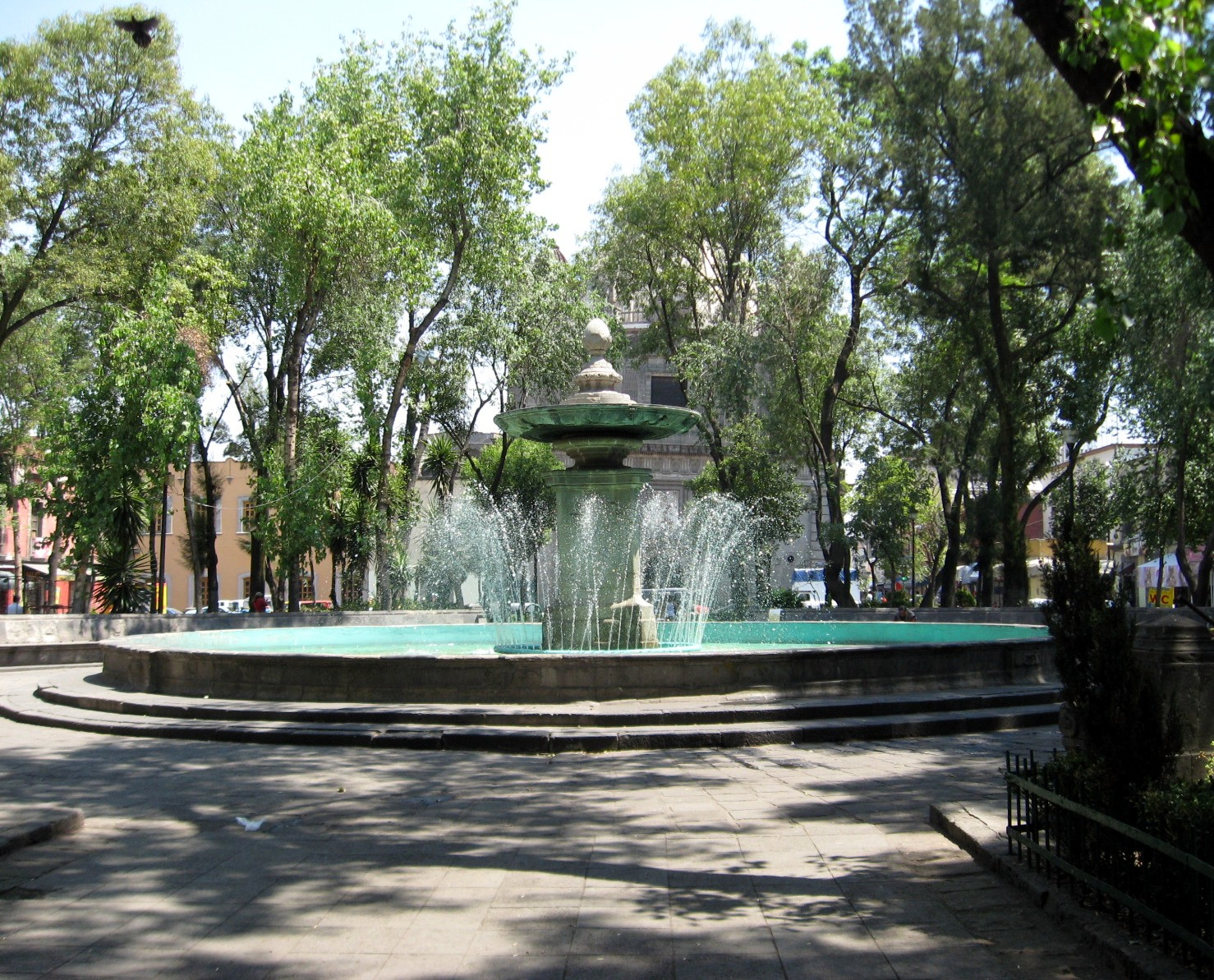
The fountain

In the 1880s, the plaza received a fountain to function as a source of water for the neighborhood. Later lighting was installed. A market dedicated to iron and glass was installed here, but it was later moved to the San Cosme Market. In 1925, the fountain that was located at the intersection of Bucareli and Barcelona, created by Manuel Tolsá, was put here to replace the old one. In 1968, the plaza was extensively remodeled, causing the destruction of the very first synagogue ever built in Mexico. It used to be on the south side of the plaza and was built in 1934. The Tolsá fountain was restored at this time, the surrounding houses and the side facade of the Church of Santa Teresa la Nueva were demolished to extend the plaza.. To the south of the plaza a statue of writer and educator Erasmo Castellanos Quinto (1880–1955) was placed.

== See also ==
- List of colonial churches in Mexico City
