= Our Lady of Mount Carmel and St Patrick Church, Oldham =

St Patrick's Church
- Our Lady of Mount Carmel and St Patrick Church
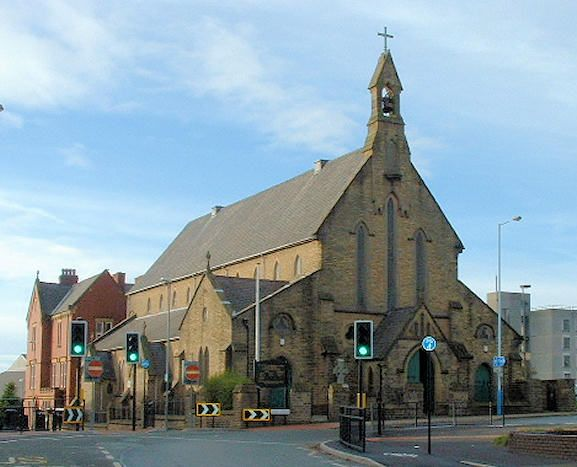
- St Patrick's Church
- 53.5392°N 2.1190°W
- OS grid reference: SD 92212 04731
- Location: Oldham, Greater Manchester
- Country: England
- Denomination: Roman Catholic
- Website: SMWSP.org.uk

History
- Status: Active
- Dedication: Blessed Virgin Mary, Saint Patrick

Architecture
- Functional status: Parish church
- Heritage designation: Grade II listed
- Designated: 8 March 1993
- Architect: Thomas Mitchell
- Style: Gothic Revival
- Groundbreaking: 28 March 1869
- Completed: 5 June 1870

Administration
- Province: Liverpool
- Diocese: Salford
- Deanery: Oldham
- Parish: St Mary with St Patrick

Our Lady of Mount Carmel and St Patrick Church or St Patrick's Church is a Roman Catholic Parish church in Oldham, Greater Manchester, England. It was founded in 1858 and was built in 1870. It is situated on the corner of John Street and Union Street West, north of Oldham Sixth Form College in the centre of the town. It is a Gothic Revival church and is a Grade II listed building.

== History ==
=== St Mary's Church ===
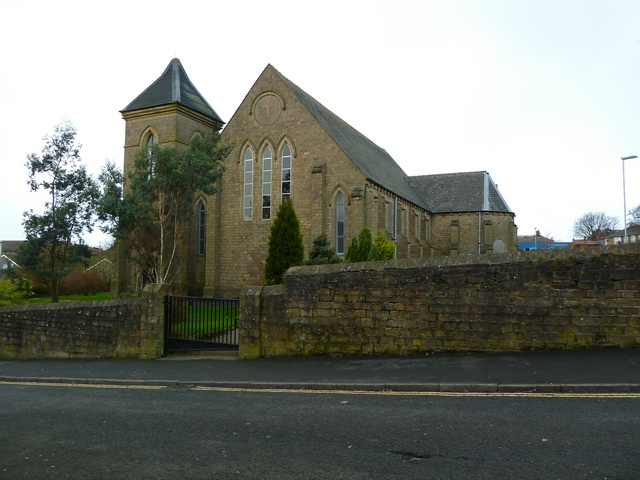
St Mary's Church

==== Foundation ====
In the 1820s, to serve the local Catholic congregation in Oldham, a priest came from St Augustine's Church in Manchester and set up a mission in the town. Originally, Mass was said in a room situated above 14 to 16 Henshaw Street. Later, this moved to a room above the Harp and Shamrock Public House. In 1829, with the increasing size of the congregation, a former Unitarian chapel on Lord Street was leased by Fr James Fisher.

==== Construction ====
When the lease expired, money for a new church was raised by a Fr Adam George Fisher, nephew of Fr James Fisher. In 1837, building work started on the church. The architect was Matthew Ellison Hadfield. On 3 March 1839, the church was opened. From 1844 to 1857, the burial ground was used. In the 1850s, the Lady Chapel and baptistery were added. In 1861, the church was damaged by anti-Catholic and anti-Irish rioters. Most of the damage was to the church windows. In 1867, the church was reopened after an extensive renovation. It was funded from money raised by Fr Grymonprez. It is the earliest Catholic church in Oldham.

=== St Patrick's Church ===
==== Foundation ====
In 1858, St Patrick's Church was founded as a chapel of ease of St Mary's Church. Fr Conway bought an existing chapel on Foundry Street to say Mass in the centre of the town. In 1862, the church became independent of St Mary's Church. That year, plans were made by a Fr Brindle for a larger church to accommodate the increasing size of the congregation. The site of the church on Union Street was given by John Lees Ainsworth.

==== Construction ====
On 28 March 1869, the foundation stone of St Patrick's Church was laid. The church was designed by Thomas Mitchell, an architect from Oldham. The building firm was Finnegans of Manchester. On 5 June 1870, the church was completed and the first Mass was said.

==== Developments ====
In 1873, a new high altar and reredos was added. It was designed by George Goldie. In 1898, the presbytery was built. The next year, in 1899, the schools on Foundry Street were rebuilt. From 1906 to 1907, the interior was reordered as new floors, side altars, confessionals, altar rails, a side porch and new seating were added.

== Parish ==
St Mary's Church is now served from St Patrick's Church and the two are in the same parish.

St Patrick's Church has three Masses on a Sunday: 10:00am, 12:30pm (in Polish) and at 6pm. St Mary's Church has one Sunday Mass, it is at 11:30am.

== Interior ==
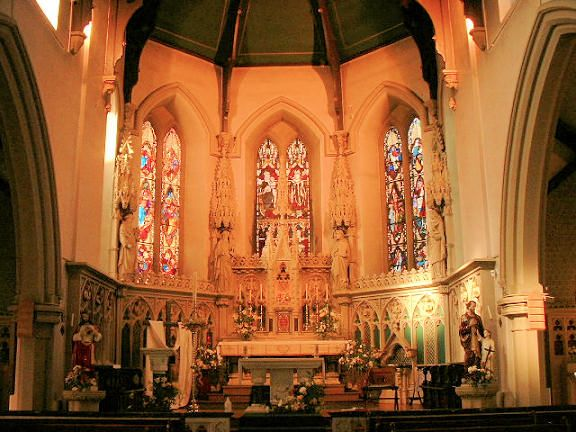
St Patrick's Church interior

== See also ==
- Roman Catholic Diocese of Salford
