= Church of Our Lady of Kazan (Tallinn) =

Church building in Tallinn, Estonia

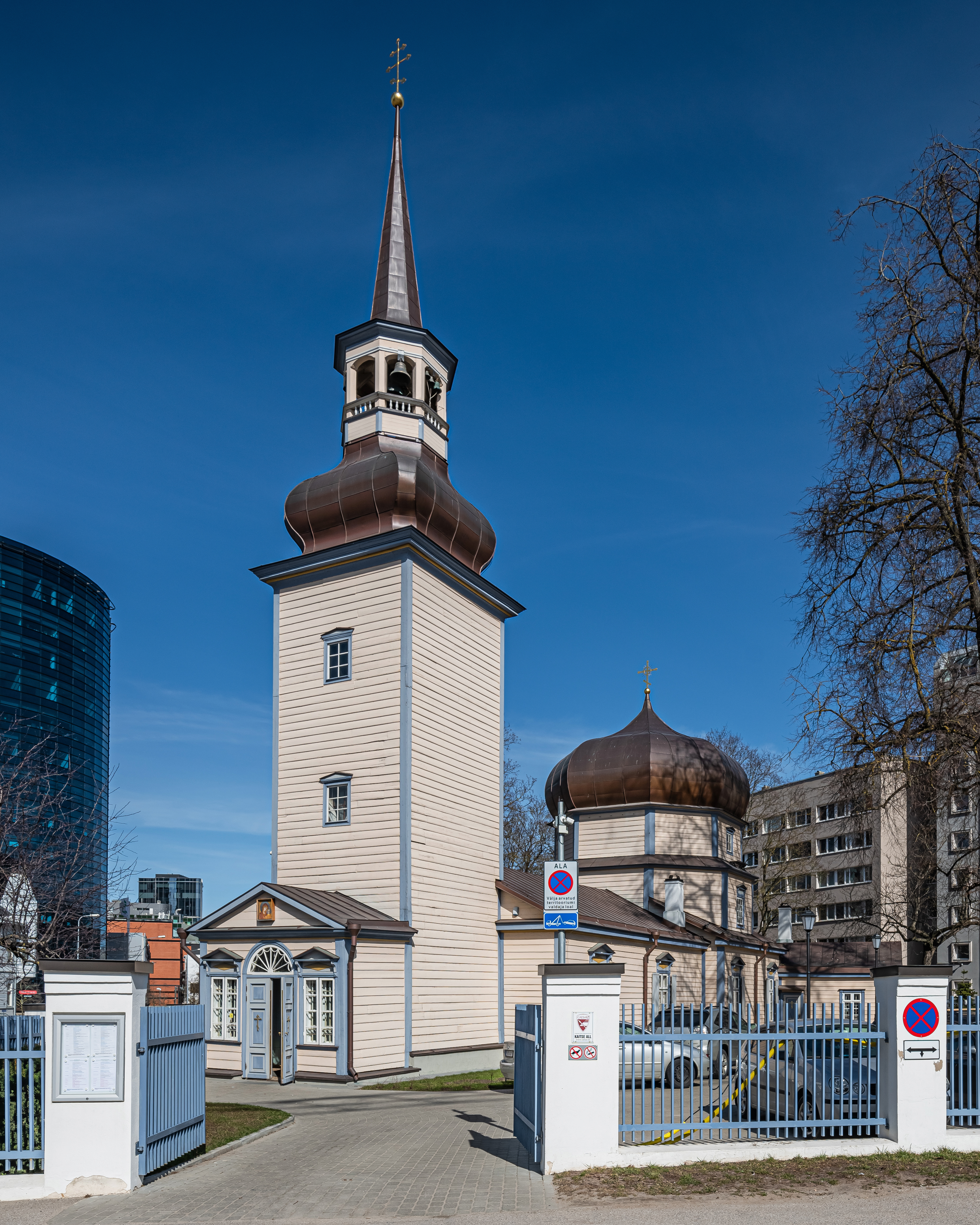
- Exterior view
- Church of Our Lady of Kazan
- 59°25′49″N 24°45′36″E
- Location: Tallinn
- Country: Estonia
- Denomination: Eastern Orthodox Church

History
- Consecrated: 1721

Church of Our Lady of Kazan (Tallinn) (Estonian: Tallinna Kaasani kirik) is a Russian Orthodox church in Tallinn, Estonia. The church building is the oldest wooden structure in Tallinn.

The church was built in 1721. At the moment of erecting, this church was the first church in Estonia completed after Great Northern War.

In the 19th century, big reconstruction works took place. After the works, the church has a neoclassical facade and interior.

Next to the church is located Church of Our Lady of Kazan's poplar (Estonian: Kaasani kiriku pappel). This poplar is the oldest and thickest poplar in Estonia.
