= Church of Our Lady, Amsterdam =

Church in Amsterdam, Netherlands

Onze Lieve Vrouwekerk
- Church of Our Lady
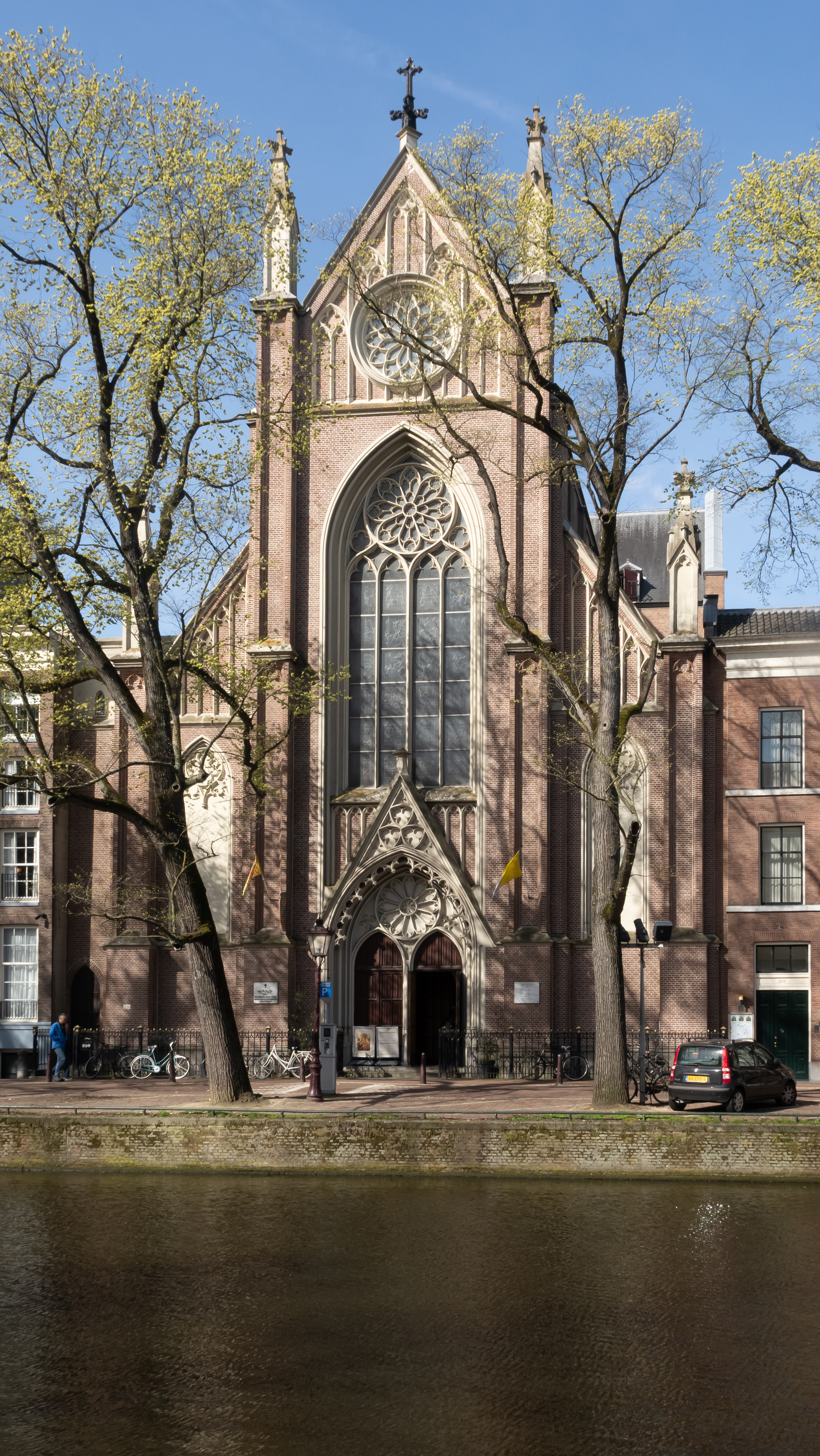
- The church in 2010
- Onze Lieve Vrouwekerk
- 52°22′22″N 4°53′4″E
- Location: Keizersgracht 220; 1016 DZ Amsterdam, Nearby Damsquare.
- Country: Netherlands
- Denomination: Shared: Syriac Orthodoxy, Roman Catholic
- Website: www.moedergodskerk.nl

History
- Founder: Redemptorist Fathers

Architecture
- Architect: Molkenboer
- Style: Neo-gothic
- Years built: 1854

Administration
- Diocese: Netherlands
- Parish: Moeder Godskerk Amsterdam

Clergy
- Priest: Saliba Antonios

Onze Lieve Vrouwekerk (Church of Our Lady)(Syriac: ܥܕܬܐ ܕܝܠܕܬ ܐܠܗܐ, Ito dyoldath Aloho) is a Syriac Orthodox church in the centre of Amsterdam. The church is used both by the Syriac Orthodox community and the Roman Catholic of Opus Dei. Emphasis is placed on the hearing of confessions and of choral liturgy. The building has the Dutch status of a Rijksmonument.

== History ==
The church was founded in 1854 by the Redemptorist Fathers and was designed by architect Theo Molkenboer. In 1985, the Redemptorists left the church due to the lack of redemptorist priests. The church was acquired by the Syriac Orthodox Church in the Netherlands and the parish was renamed to Moeder Godskerk (Church of the Mother of God). The church never closed for the Roman and Surinam Catholic believers.

== Services ==
- Syriac Orthodox
- Catholic
  - Special masses for the Italian and Surinam communities and masses in English.
