= Church of Our Lady, Melsele =

Church of Our Lady
- Dutch: Onze-Lieve-Vrouwkerk
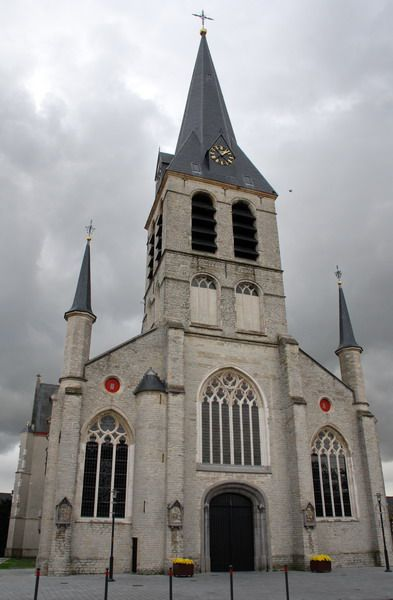
- Church of Our Lady
- 51°13′17″N 4°16′56″E
- Location: Melsele; Beveren, East Flanders
- Country: Belgium
- Denomination: Roman Catholic Church

History
- Status: Parish church
- Dedication: St. Mary

Architecture
- Heritage designation: registered heritage site (beschermd erfgoed)
- Designated: 1982
- Architectural type: Primarily Gothic

Administration
- Diocese: Ghent

The Church of Our Lady (Dutch: Onze-Lieve-Vrouwekerk) is a Roman Catholic parish church in Melsele, in the municipality of Beveren, in East Flanders, Belgium. It is a registered heritage site (beschermd erfgoed).

== History ==
The church was first mentioned in writing in 1055. The current building, primarily Gothic, was built from the 13th to the 17th century. As of 1936, the three choirs were registered monuments, whereas the whole building was registered in 1982. In 1995, original paintings of the 15th-century vault were discovered in the upper choir. In 2001, the restoration of the church was nominated for the Flemish Monument Award.

== Organ ==
The pipe organ of the church dates back to the 18th century. Its latest restoration took place in 1989. The organ belongs to the Melsele Organ Committee (Orgelcomité Melsele), an association without a lucrative purpose.

Each year, an organ concert takes place in the church.
