= Llanos de Olivenza =

- Comarca
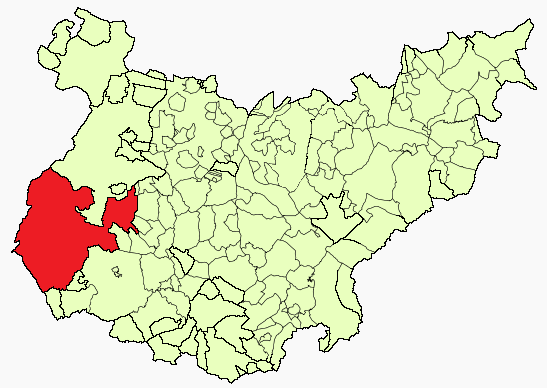
- Location in the province of Badajoz
- Coordinates: 38°40′55″N 7°6′5″W
- Country: Spain
- Autonomous community: Extremadura
- Province: Badajoz
- Capital: Olivenza
- Municipalities: List: Alconchel, Almendral, Barcarrota, Cheles, Higuera de Vargas, Nogales, Olivenza, Táliga

Area
  - Total: 1,647 km^{2} (636 sq mi)

Population (2015)
  - Total: 32,792
  - Density: 19.91/km^{2} (51.57/sq mi)
- Time zone: UTC+1 (CET)
  - Summer (DST): UTC+2 (CEST)
- Largest municipality: Olivenza

Llanos de Olivenza is a comarca in the province of Badajoz in the autonomous community of Extremadura, western Spain. It borders with Portugal in the west.

== Municipalities ==
- Alconchel
- Almendral
- Barcarrota
- Cheles
- Higuera de Vargas
- Nogales
- Olivenza
- Táliga
- Torre de Miguel Sesmero
- Valverde de Leganés
- Villanueva del Fresno

== Demographics ==
In 2015 Llanos de Olivenza had a population of 32,792 people with a arimetic population density of 20 people per kilometer squared.
