= Grandee =

Aristocratic title conferred on Spanish nobility

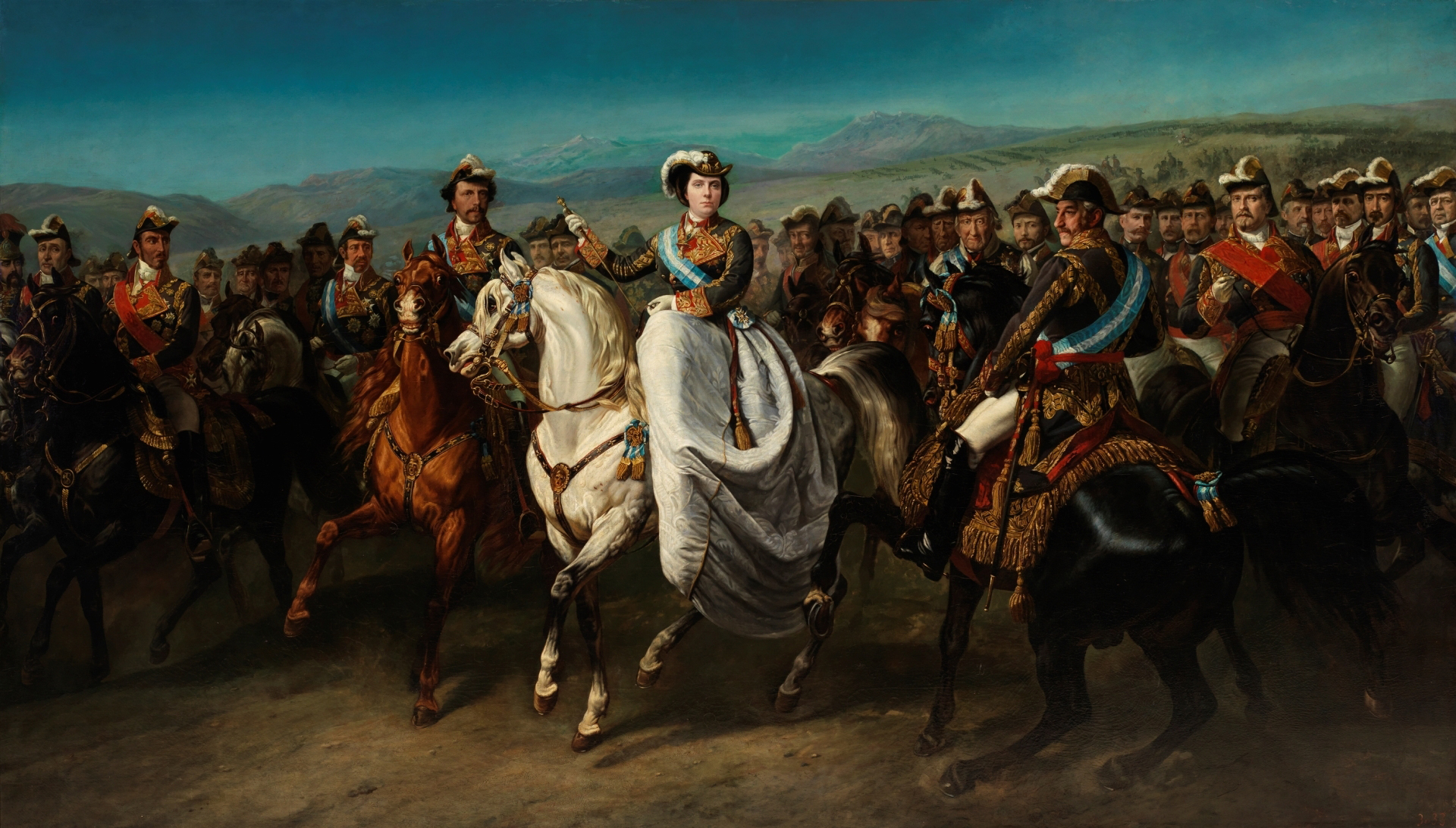
Equestrian portrait of Isabella II, her husband Francis, King Consort of Spain (left), and Infante Francisco de Paula (right) with the most important Spanish statesmen and army officers of the time, many of whom were grandees of Spain, by Charles Porion, 1862

Grandee (/ɡrənˈdiː/; Spanish: Grande de España, Spanish: [ˈɡɾande]) is an official aristocratic title conferred on some Spanish nobility. Holders of this dignity historically enjoyed privileges comparable in some respects to those of the peerage of France during the Ancien Régime.

With the exception of Fernandina, all Spanish dukedoms are automatically attached to a grandeeship, yet only a few marquessates, countships, viscountcies, baronies and lordships have the distinction. A single person can be a grandee of Spain multiple times, as grandeeships are attached, except in a few cases, to a title and not an individual. Such grandees with more than one title notably include the current Duchess of Medinaceli and the Duke of Alba, who are grandees ten and nine times respectively. All sons and daughters of Infantes are also grandees.

According to the 1876 Constitution, fully in force until 1923, grandees of Spain could also be senators por derecho propio ("in their own right"), alongside archbishops and top military ranks.

As of 2018, grandeeships totalled 417 out of the 2,942 extant titles in Spain (approximately 14%) of which there were 153 Dukedoms, 142 Marquessates, 108 Countships, 2 Viscountcies, 2 Baronies, 3 Lordships and 7 hereditary grandees with no title attached to the grandeeship. Despite losing their last legal privilege in 1984, when the right to possess diplomatic passports and immunity was revoked for all grandees of Spain, they still enjoy certain ceremonial privileges. All grandees are entitled to remain covered in the presence of the King of Spain, as well as being addressed by him as primo (cousin), a privilege that originated in the 16th century, when most grandees were close relatives of the Monarch.

Outside Spain, the term can refer to other people of a somewhat comparable, exalted position, roughly synonymous with magnate; formerly a rank of high nobility (especially when it carried the right to a parliamentary seat). By extension, the term can refer informally to any important person of high status, particularly wealthy, landed long-time residents in a region. In the United Kingdom the term is currently and informally used of influential and long-standing members of the Conservative Party, Labour Party and Liberal Democrats, and has had more specific meanings in the past.

== Origins and privileges ==
Coronet of a grandee of Spain

Most Spanish noble titles are granted as títulos del Reino (Peer of the realm), many of which predate the modern Spanish monarchy. The Kings of Spain re-established in 1520 the ancient dignity of Grande to confer as an additional rank of honour. The post-nominals of grandees of Spain are GE.

The dignity of grandee (Grand noble) began to be assumed by Spain's leading noblemen in the Middle Ages to distinguish them as a Grand señor ('Lord of the realm'), from lesser ricoshombres (Nobles de naturaleza), whose rank evolved into that of hidalgo. It was, as John Selden the 17th-century English jurist pointed out, not a general term denoting a class, but "an additional individual dignity not only to all Dukes but to some Marquesses and Counts also". Noble titles, including and above the rank of Count, were seldom created in heredity by the Kings of Castile and Aragon until the late Middle Ages—in contrast to France and elsewhere in Europe (where feudalism evolved more quickly)—being largely associated with royal officers until the 14th century. The conferral of grandeeships initially conveyed only ceremonial privileges, such as remaining covered or seated in the presence of royalty. Over time grandees received more substantial rights: for example freedom from taxation and immunity from arrest, save at the King's command; they were usually the senior judicial officers of their region. These rights later became open to abuse with some grandees renouncing their allegiance to the monarchy to wage war on the King.

In the late 1470s, King Ferdinand II and Queen Isabella I were the first to clamp down on grandee powers assumed by the medieval territorial nobles. In the 16th century, limitations on the number of grandees were introduced by King Charles I (who later became Holy Roman Emperor as Charles V), who decreed that the Spanish Crown had the sole right to confer the dignity of a grandee.

Subsequently, the grandes de España (grandees of Spain) were subdivided into three grades:

1. those who spoke to the King, and received his reply, in full regalia;
2. those who addressed the King uncovered, but by right wore their coronets to hear his answer;
3. those who required permission from the King before wearing their coronets.

Heraldic mantle of a grandee of Spain

All grandees traditionally have been addressed by the king as mi Primo (my cousin), whereas ordinary nobles are formally styled as mi Pariente (my kinsman). Grandezas could also be bestowed upon foreigners, such as the memorialist Louis de Rouvroy, Duc de Saint-Simon who took great pride in becoming a grandee after his successful posting as French Ambassador to Madrid, representing King Louis XIV. The dignity was highly considered by foreign peers. For an extensive period of time, it was even deemed 'the pinnacle of nobiliary stratification'. Foreign grandees were mostly French, although there was also a significant number of German, Flemish, Walloon, Italian, and Novohispanic/Aztec peers, as a result of the scope of the Spanish Empire in Europe and the Americas. Some examples included the Dukes of Wellington, Bavaria, Villars, Mouchy, Moctezuma de Tultengo, Doudeauville, Croÿ, the Princes of Sulmona, Ligne, and the Counts of Egmont.

The dignity of grandee was abolished by the Napoleonic King Joseph Bonaparte, before being revived in 1834 by Estatuto real when grandees were given precedence in the Chamber of Peers of Spain.

Nowadays, all grandees are deemed to be "of the first class", and it is an honorific dignity conferring neither power nor legal privilege. A Grandeza de España (grandeeship) is a separate legal entity from a title of nobility, although grandezas are normally but not exclusively granted in conjunction with a title. Since the 20th century invariably the King of Spain has conferred a Grandeza de España upon any newly created duke.

A grandee of any noble rank is higher in precedence than a non-grandee (apart from members of the Spanish Royal Family), even if that non-grandee holds a hereditary title (titulo) of a higher grade than that of the said grandee. Thus, a baron-grandee would outrank a non-grandee marquess, thus rendering the dignity of grandeza an hereditary rank of precedence rather than a title of nobility. Since 1987, children of an infante of Spain are recognised as members of the Spanish royal family and are accorded the rank and style of a grandee by courtesy: they do not formally hold this dignity until such time as a title with grandeza is granted to them by the sovereign.

Some of the best known Spanish grandees are the dukes of Arcos, of Alba, of Medinaceli, of Villahermosa, of Osuna, del Infantado, of Alburquerque, of Moctezuma, of Frías and of Medina-Sidonia; well-known marquesses include those of Aguilar de Campoo, of Astorga, of Santillana, and of los Vélez; the counts of Benavente, of Lerín, Olivares, Oñate, and Lemos also hold grandeeships.

Grandees and their consorts are entitled to the honorific prefix of 'the Most Excellent Lord/Lady' or 'His/Her Most Excellency', and they can be addressed as Primo (cousin) by the King, although this tradition is in disuse today.

== Portugal and Brazil ==
Both Portuguese and Brazilian nobility adopted the term grande ("grandee") from the Spanish, to designate a higher rank of noblemen. The Brazilian system automatically deemed dukes, marquises and counts (as well as archbishops and bishops) grandes do Império ("grandees of the Empire", or literally translated as "Great Ones of the Empire"). Viscounts and barons could also be ennobled with or without grandeza ("grandeeship", alternatively "greatness").

Viscounts ennobled with grandeeship displayed a count's coronet on their coat of arms, and barons ennobled with grandeeship bore a coat of arms surmounted by a viscount's coronet.

The order of precedence in Brazilian nobility was as follows: after the members of the Imperial Family, dukes, marquises, counts, viscounts with grandeeship, viscounts without grandeeship, barons with grandeeship, barons without grandeeship. Brazilian grandeeships, like its nobility, were not hereditary titles.

Grandees were allowed to keep their heads covered in the presence of the king or emperor until such time as the monarch may command otherwise; as elsewhere throughout Europe, these noble families displayed their coats of arms on their properties, carriages (or vehicles), and over their graves (see hatchment). The abolition of the monarchies in Portugal and Brazil extinguished the formal use of such titles, although their use continues among some of the Portuguese aristocracies.

== New Model Army ==
During the Wars of the Three Kingdoms, senior military officers from the English landed gentry who served in the New Model Army, who were opposed to the more radical Levellers, came to be informally termed "grandees". After the defeat of Charles I of England in the Second English Civil War, there was a series of debates and confrontations between radical, elected representatives of New Model Army soldiers, known as the Agitators, and the Army's grandees such as Sir Thomas Fairfax, Oliver Cromwell and Henry Ireton, who opposed the Agitators' more radical proposals. These disagreements were aired publicly at the Putney Debates, which started in late October 1647 and lasted for several weeks.

== See also ==
- List of current grandees of Spain
- Permanent Deputation and Council of Grandees of Spain and Titles of the Kingdom
- Hidalgo (nobility)
- Fidalgo
- Flaith

== Bibliography ==
- de Mestas, Alberto (1963). de Cadenas y Vicent, Vicente (ed.). "Las Grandezas de España otorgadas a franceses". Hidalguía. 11 (57). Instituto Salazar y Castro: 155–192.
