= Lord of Higuera de Vargas =

Hereditary royal title

Lordship of Higuera de Vargas
- Creation date: 1390
- Created by: John I
- Peerage: Peerage of Spain
- First holder: Alonso Fernández de Vargas, 1st Lord of Higuera de Vargas
- Present holder: Manuel Falcó y Anchorena, 25th Lord of Higuera de Vargas

Lord of Higuera de Vargas (Spanish: Señor de Higuera de Vargas) is a hereditary title in the Peerage of Spain accompanied by the dignity of Grandee, granted in 1390 by John I to Alonso Fernández de Vargas. The title makes reference to Higuera de Vargas, a town in Badajoz.

== Lords of Higuera de Vargas (1390) ==
- Alonso Fernández de Vargas, 1st Lord of Higuera de Vargas
- Gonzalo Pérez de Vargas, 2nd Lord of Higuera de Vargas
- Juan de Vargas y Sánchez de Badajoz, 3rd Lord of Higuera de Vargas
- Juan de Vargas y Suárez de Figueroa, 4th Lord of Higuera de Vargas
- Mencía de Vargas y Suárez de Figueroa, 5th Lord of Higuera de Vargas
- Arias Pérez de Silva y Vargas-Figueroa, 6th Lord of Higuera de Vargas
- Francisco de Vargas y Silva, 7th Lord of Higuera de Vargas
- Juan de Vargas y Silva, 8th Lord of Higuera de Vargas
- Francisco de Vargas y Silva, 9th Lord of Higuera de Vargas
- García Pérez de Vargas y Silva, 10th Lord of Higuera de Vargas
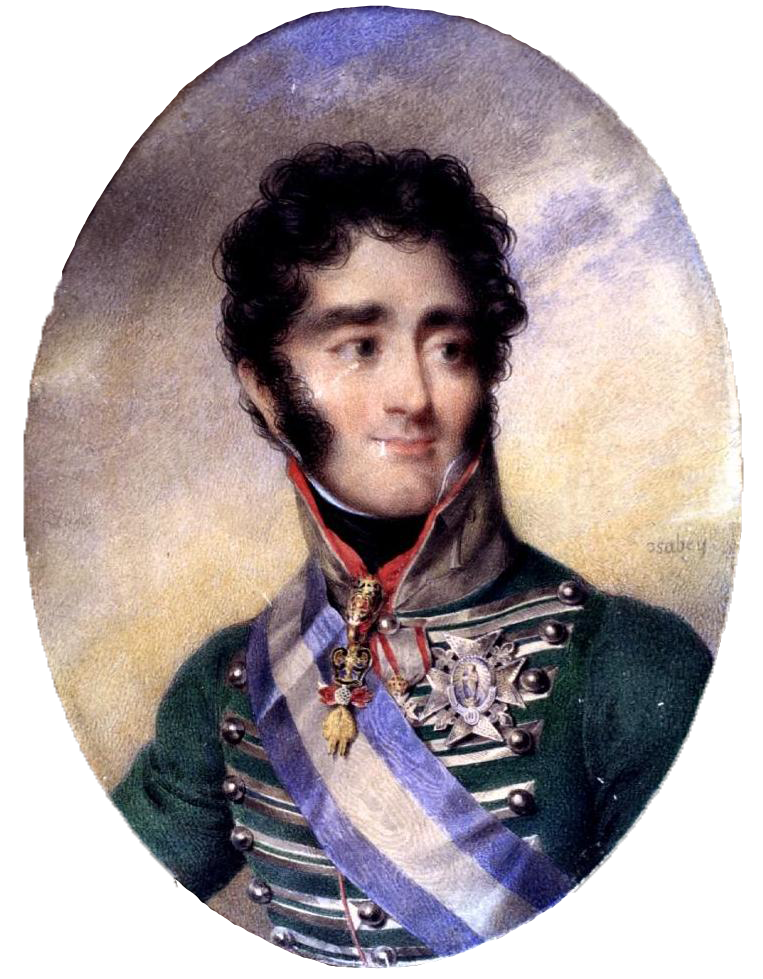
  The 20th Lord by Jean-Baptiste Isabey, c. 1817
- Juana de Vargas y Silva, 11th Lady of Higuera de Vargas
- Gabriel de Silva y Vargas, 12th Lord of Higuera de Vargas
- Francisco de Silva y Vargas de Mendoza, 13th Lord of Higuera de Vargas
- Isabel de Silva y Vargas de Mendoza, 14th Lady of Higuera de Vargas
- Fernando Sánchez de Silva y Vargas, 15h Lord of Higuera de Vargas
- Juan Sánchez de Silva y Vega, 16th Lord of Higuera de Vargas
- Juana Sánchez De Silva y Cáceres, 17th Lady of Higuera de Vargas
- María Joaquina de Cáceres y Quiñones, 18th Lady of Higuera de Vargas
- María de la Esclavitud Sarmiento de Sotomayor y Quiñones, 19th Lady of Higuera de Vargas
- Carlos Gutiérrez de los Ríos y Sarmiento de Sotomayor, 20th Lord of Higuera de Vargas
- María Gutiérrez de los Ríos y Vicente de Solís, 21st Lady of Higuera de Vargas
- María del Pilar Osorio y Gutiérrez de los Ríos, 22nd Lady of Higuera de Vargas
- Manuel Felipe Falcó y Osorio, 23rd Lord of Higuera de Vargas
- Manuel Falcó y Álvarez de Toledo, 24th Lord of Higuera de Vargas
- Manuel Falcó y Anchorena, 25th Lord of Higuera de Vargas

== See also ==
- List of lords in the peerage of Spain
- List of current grandees of Spain
