= Porion (surname) =

Porion is a French surname. Notable people with the surname include:

- Charles Porion (1814–1868), French painter
- Louis Porion (1805–1858), French politician
