= Lord of Casa Lazcano =

Lordship of Casa Lazcano
- Creation date: 31 Augusto 1780
- Created by: Charles III
- Peerage: Peerage of Spain
- First holder: Joaquín de Arteaga y Lazcano, 1st Lord of Casa Lazcano
- Present holder: Almudena de Arteaga y del Alcázar, 8th Lady of Casa Lazcano

Lord of Casa Lazcano (Spanish: Señor de la Casa de Lazcano) is a hereditary title in the Peerage of Spain accompanied by the dignity of Grandee, granted in 1780 by Charles III to Joaquín de Arteaga y Lazcano, descendant of the fiefdom of the Lords of Lazcano originally created in 1330 by Alfonso XI.

== Lords of Casa Lazcano (1780) ==
- Joaquín de Arteaga y Lazcano, 1st Lord of Casa Lazcano
- Ignacio Ciro de Arteaga e Idiázquez, 2nd Lord of Casa Lazcano
- Andrés Avelino de Arteaga y Palafox, 3rd Lord of Casa Lazcano
- Andrés Avelino de Arteaga y Silva, 4th Lord of Casa Lazcano
- Joaquín Ignacio de Arteaga y Echagüe, 5th Lord of Casa Lazcano
- Iñigo de Arteaga y Falguera, 6th Lord of Casa Lazcano
- Iñigo de Arteaga y Martín, 7th Lord of Casa Lazcano
- Almudena de Arteaga y del Alcázar, 8th Lady of Casa Lazcano

== See also ==
- List of lords in the peerage of Spain
- List of current grandees of Spain
