= Coronet =

Crown

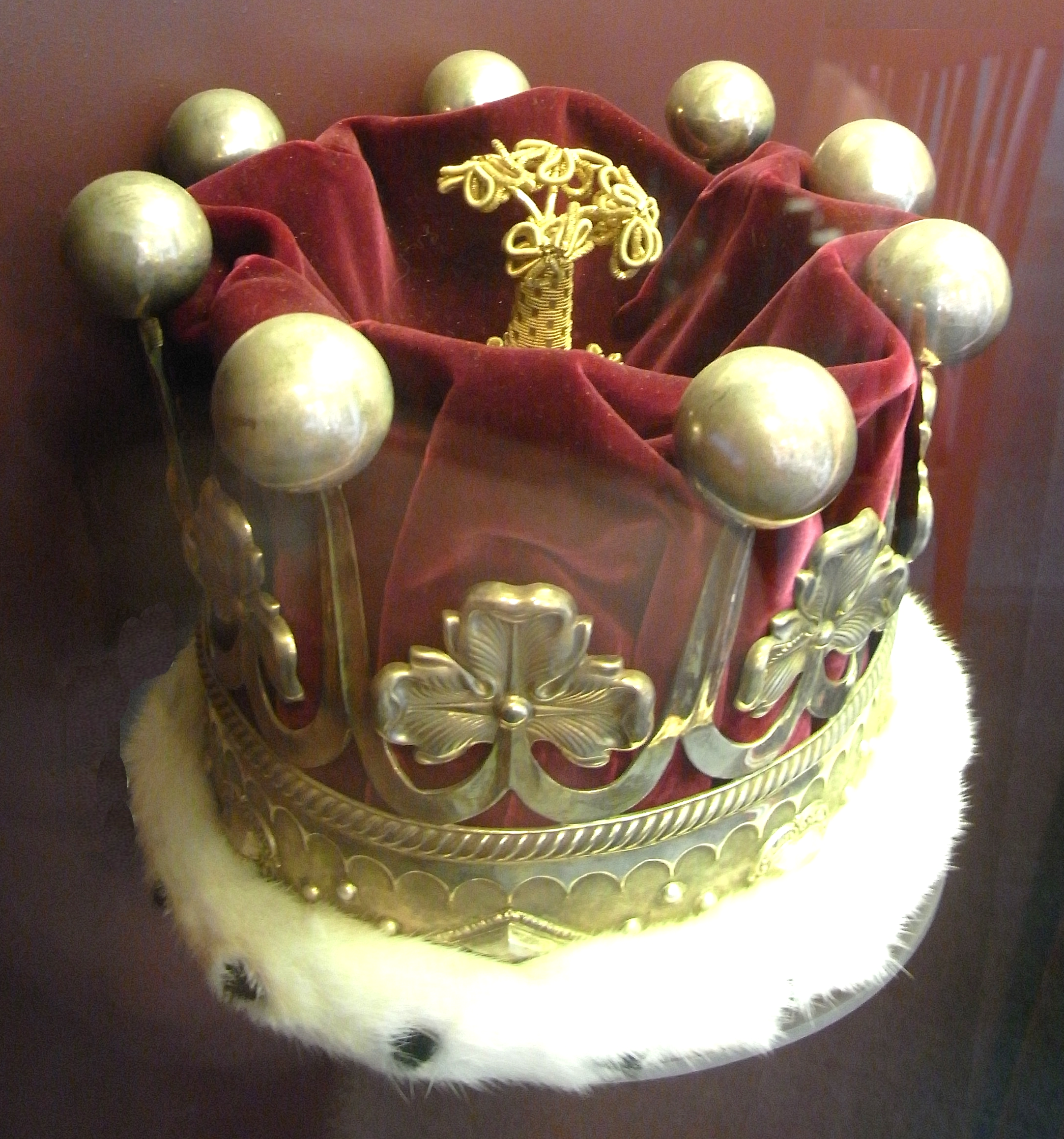
Coronet of an earl (as worn by the 17th Earl of Devon at the coronation of Elizabeth II and now on display at Powderham Castle)

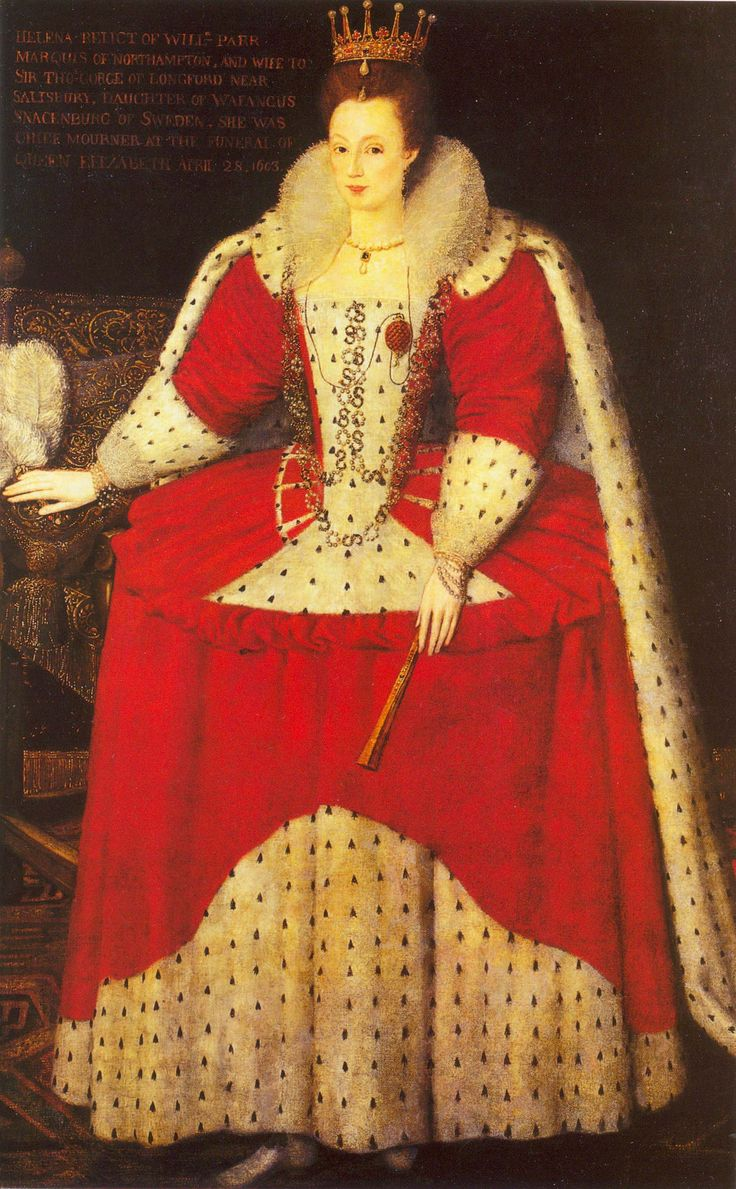
Portrait of Helena Snakenborg, Marchioness of Northampton, in robes for the 1603 coronation of James I. She wears a marchioness' coronet, which differs from the later standardised design with four leaves and four balls.

In British heraldry, a coronet (/ˈkɒrənɪt/, KORR-uh-nit) is a type of crown that is a mark of rank of non-reigning members of the royal family and peers. In other languages, this distinction is not made, and usually the same word for crown is used irrespective of rank (German: Krone, Dutch: kroon, Swedish: krona, French: couronne, Italian: corona, Polish: korona etc.). In this use, the English coronet is a purely technical term for all heraldic images of crowns not used by a sovereign. A coronet is another type of crown, but is reserved for the nobility: dukes, marquesses, earls, viscounts and barons. The specific design and attributes of the crown or coronet signifies the hierarchy and ranking of its owner.

Certain physical coronets are worn by the British peerage on rare ceremonial occasions, such as the coronation of the monarch. These are also sometimes depicted in heraldry, and called coronets of rank in heraldic usage. Their shape varies depending on the wearer's rank in the peerage, according to models laid down in the 16th century. Similar depictions of crowns of rank (German: Rangkronen) are used in continental heraldry, but physical headgear has never been made to imitate them.

Due to the extreme rarity of occasions in which peers' coronets are worn (sometimes more than fifty years pass before a new coronation and occasion to wear physical coronets), practical use of the term coronet today is almost exclusively confined to pictorial crowns and rank symbols in heraldry, adorning someone's coat of arms (indeed, many people entitled to a coronet never have a physical one made). Depiction of ordinary crowns or coronets in heraldry, rather than coronets of rank, including a variety of crest coronets sometimes placed under the crest, are not confined to peers, and are often shown in British heraldry outside the peerage.

== Etymology ==
The word stems from the Old French coronete, a diminutive of co(u)ronne ('crown'), itself from the Latin: corona, lit. 'crown, wreath' and from the Ancient Greek: κορώνη, romanized: korōnē, lit. 'garland, wreath'.

Traditionally, such headgear is used by nobles and by princes and princesses in their coats of arms, rather than by monarchs, for whom the word 'crown' is customarily reserved in English, while many languages have no such terminological distinction. As a coronet shows the rank of the respective noble, in the German and Scandinavian languages there is also the term rangkrone (literally 'rank crown').

== Usage in the United Kingdom and Commonwealth ==
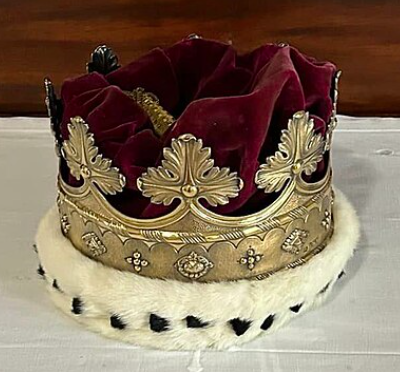
Coronet of the Dukes of Manchester, chased as jewelled but not actually gemmed, with eight strawberry leaves.

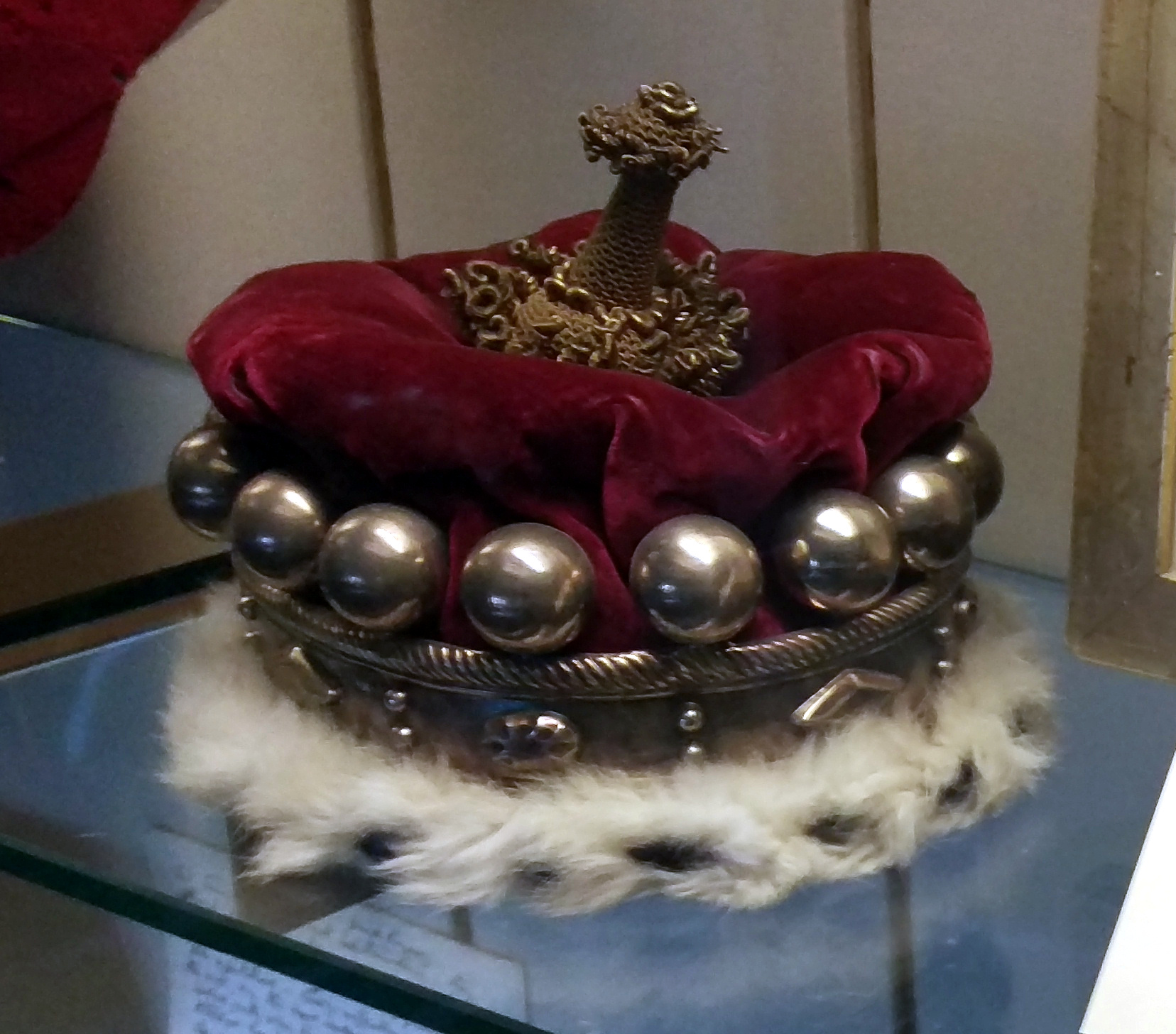
Coronet of the 6th Viscount Clifden, with sixteen silver spheres.

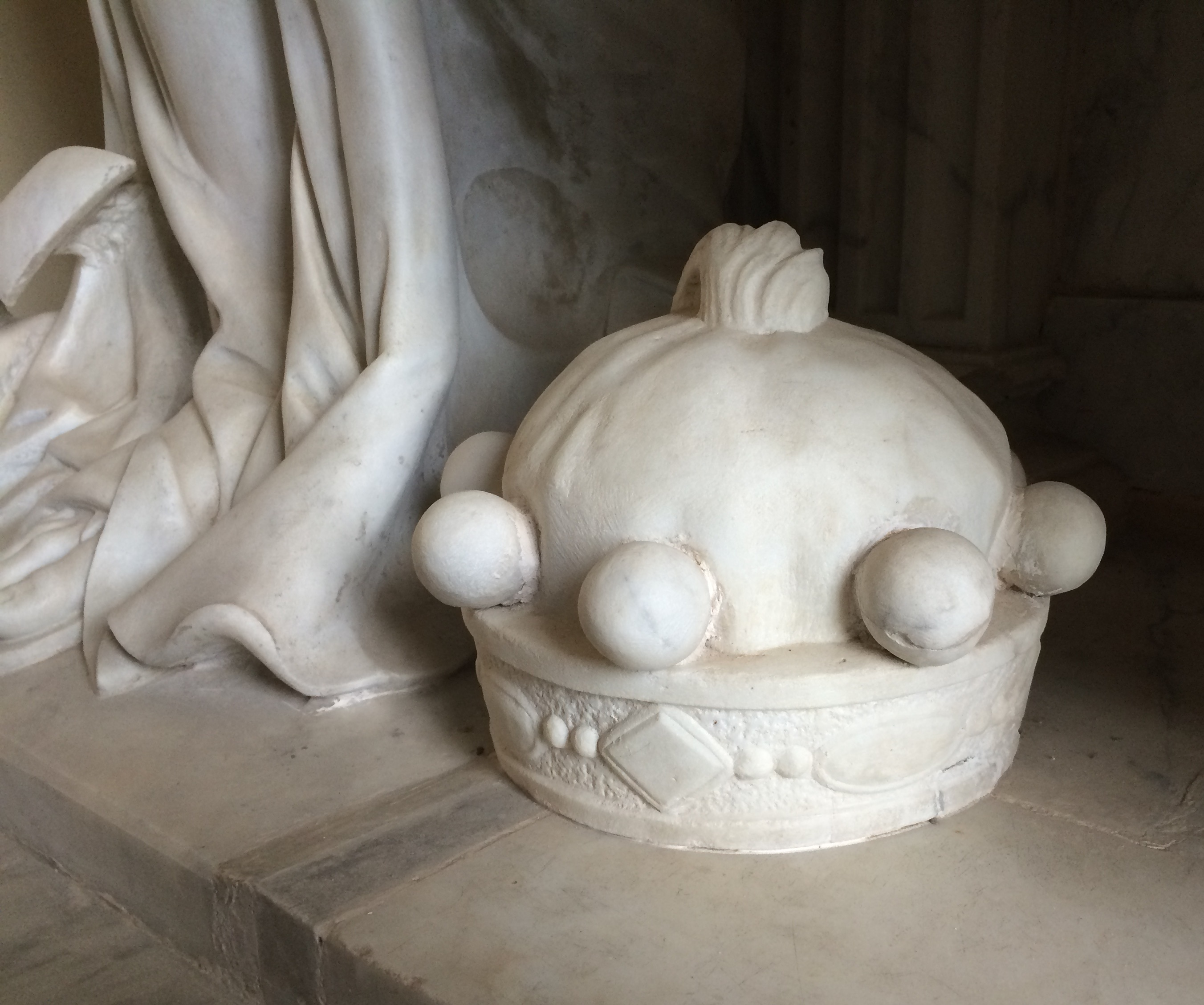
Depiction of a baron's coronet on a 17th-century funerary monument

=== Royal usage ===
Members of the British royal family often display coronets in their coats of arms and may wear actual coronets at coronations (e.g., Princesses Elizabeth and Margaret at the 1937 coronation of their father as George VI). Such coronets were made according to regulations instituted by Charles II in 1661, shortly after his return from exile in France (getting a taste for its lavish court style; Louis XIV started monumental work at Versailles that year). They vary depending on the individual's relationship to the monarch. Occasionally, additional royal warrants vary the designs for individuals.

The most recent (and most comprehensive) royal warrant concerning coronets was the 19 November 1917 warrant of George V. The coronet of the British heir apparent is distinctive in itself, as it has a single arch with a globe and cross. Charles III opted against the use of coronets at his coronation in 2023, for both members of the royal family and peers, but he did not abolish the tradition.

=== Usage by peers ===
In the United Kingdom, a peer traditionally wears a coronet on one occasion only – for a royal coronation, when it is worn along with coronation robes, equally standardised as a luxurious uniform. However, for the 2023 coronation of Charles III and Camilla, on the government's advice, the King forbade the wearing of coronets by those peers who had been invited, except those performing specific ceremonial roles.

In the peerages of the United Kingdom, the design of a coronet shows the rank of its owner, as in German, French and various other heraldic traditions. Dukes were the first individuals authorised to wear coronets. Marquesses acquired coronets in the 15th century, earls in the 16th, then viscounts and barons in the 17th. Until the barons received coronets in 1661, the coronets of earls, marquesses and dukes were engraved, while those of viscounts were plain. After 1661, however, viscomital coronets became engraved, while baronial coronets were plain. Coronets may not bear any precious or semi-precious stones. Since people entitled to wear a coronet customarily display it in their coat of arms above the shield and below the helmet and crest, this can provide a useful clue as to the owner of a given coat of arms.

British coronets traditionally display leaves of the strawberry plant; it is not clear when this traditional began. In one tradition, the strawberry leaf's three parts represent the Trinity; the red fruit represents Christ's blood; and the five-petalled flower represents the wounds of Christ, making the strawberry a symbol of perfection and righteousness. In 1879, John Churchill Sikes wrote that the leaves were originally generic in form and only later became strawberry leaves. In the writings of Benjamin Disraeli, strawberry leaves are often used as a metonym for the Peerage: It had got about that she admired intellect, and, though she claimed the highest social position, that a booby [fool] would not content her, even if his ears were covered with strawberry leaves. Similarly, Saki has a character refer to a duke as a "silly little strawberry-leafed nonentity."

=== Table of coronet rankings ===
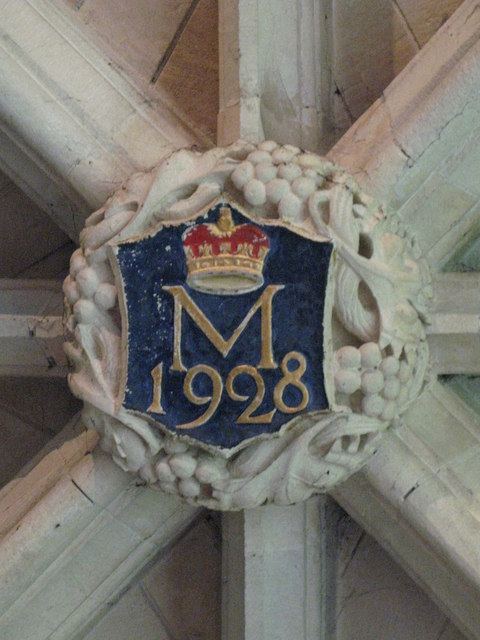
Plaque in the roof of the cloister of St Bartholomew-the-Great, London; it bears the monogram of Mary, Princess Royal and Countess of Harewood (daughter of George V) and the coronet of a child of a sovereign (crosses and fleurs-de-lis).

Image	Details
Princes and Princesses
	Heir apparent Used by a British heir apparent.
	Child of a sovereign A coronet of crosses and fleurs-de-lis.
	Child of an heir apparent A coronet of crosses, strawberry leaves and fleurs-de-lis.
	Child of a son of a sovereign A coronet of crosses and strawberry leaves.
	Child of a daughter of a sovereign A coronet of strawberry leaves and fleurs-de-lis.
(Non-royal) Peers and Peeresses
	Duke or Duchess A silver-gilt circlet, chased as jewelled but not actually gemmed, with eight strawberry leaves of which five are seen in two-dimensional representations.
	Marquess or Marchioness A coronet of four strawberry leaves and four silver spheres (known as "pearls", but not actually pearls), slightly raised on points above the rim, of which three leaves and two balls are seen in two-dimensional representations.
	Earl or Countess A coronet of eight strawberry leaves (four visible) and eight "pearls" raised on stalks, of which five are visible in two-dimensional representations.
	Viscount or Viscountess A coronet of sixteen "pearls" touching one another, nine being seen in representation.
	Baron or Baroness, Lord or Lady of Parliament A plain silver-gilt circlet, with six "pearls", four visible in two-dimensional representations.

=== Municipal usage ===
Certain types of Scottish local government bodies have special coronet types assigned to them.

Image	Details
	Coronet of a Scottish Regional Council (1973–1996) A circlet richly chased from which are issuant four thistles leaved (one and two halves visible) Or.
	Coronet of a Scottish Island Council (1973–1996) A circlet richly chased from which are issuant four dolphins two and two respectant naiant embowed (two visible) Or.
	Coronet of a Scottish District Council (1973–1996) A circlet richly chased from which are issuant eight thistle heads (of which three and two halves are visible) Or.
	Coronet of a Scottish Community Council (1973–present) A circlet richly chased from which are issuant four thistle leaves (one and two halves visible) and four pine cones (two visible).

=== Other uses ===
In Canadian heraldry, descendants of the United Empire Loyalists are entitled to use a Loyalist military coronet (for descendants of members of Loyalist regiments) or a Loyalist civil coronet (for others) in their coats of arms. This possibility was introduced by the Canadian Heraldic Authority in 1989.

English King of Arms

Loyalist military coronet (Canadian)

Loyalist civil coronet (Canadian)

== Belgian coronet rankings ==
These are the heraldic crowns and coronets as they are in use today in the Kingdom of Belgium. In the past, the systems of the German (Holy Roman Empire), Spanish and Austrian monarchies, as well as those of the First French Empire and the United Kingdom of the Netherlands, have also been in use on the current Belgian territory.

King or Queen

Crown prince(ss)

Prince(ss)

Duke, Duchess

Marquis(e)

Count(ess)

Viscount(ess)

Baron(ess)

Ridder (knight)

Ecuyer and untitled Nobility

== Danish coronet rankings ==
Crown prince or crown princess

Non-hereditary prince or princess

Duke

Marquis

Count

Baron

Crown of Nobility

== Spanish coronet rankings ==
All over the world, Spanish heraldry has used these crowns and coronets:

Heir Apparent

Heir Apparent
(Variant for the Spanish territories of the former Crown of Aragon)

Infante or Infanta
(Prince or Princess)

Infante or Infanta
(Variant for the Spanish territories of the former Crown of Aragon)

Spanish Grandee

Duke

Marquess

Count

Viscount

Baron

Lord (señor)

Hidalgo (Spanish nobleman)

Spanish Officer of Arms (Herald and Pursuivant / Persevante)

== Swedish coronet rankings ==
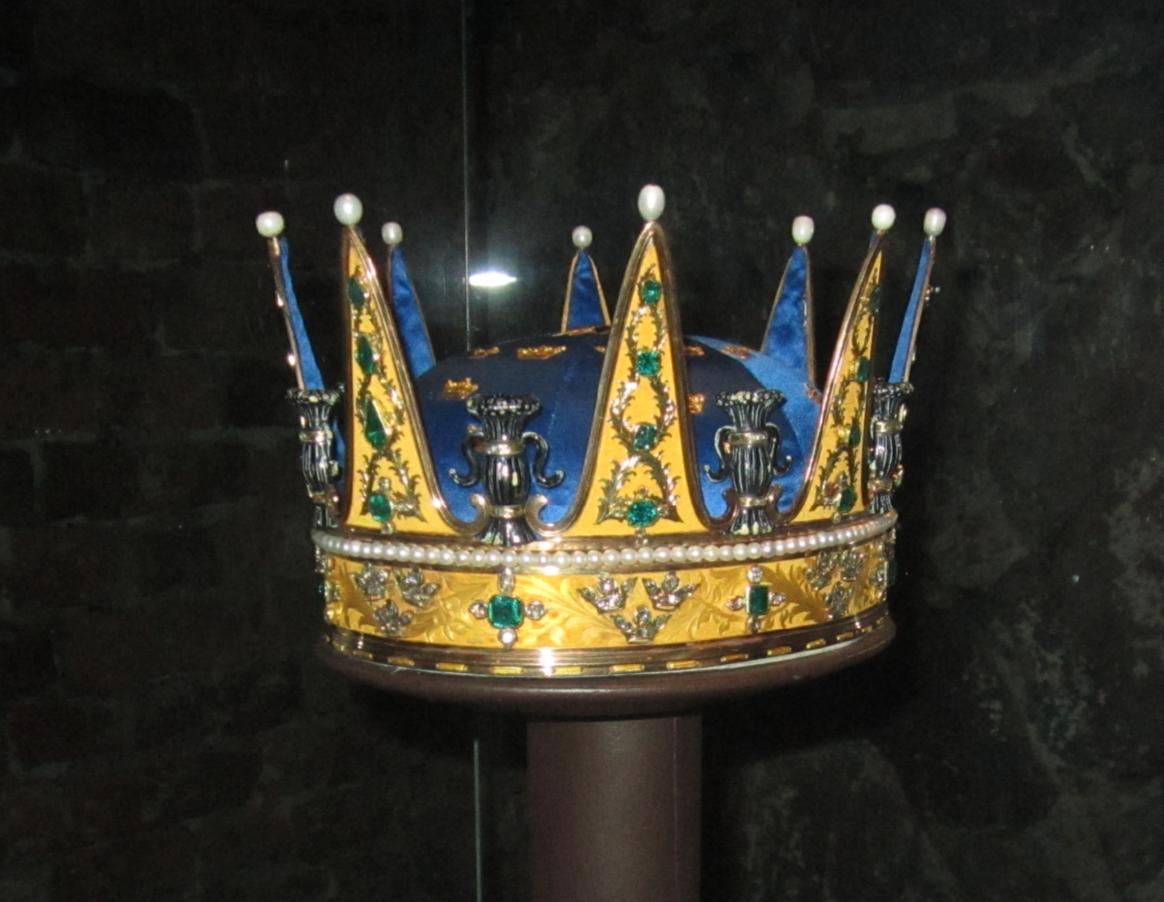
The coronet of a Swedish duke (always a Swedish prince).

Heir Apparent

Duke / Duchess

Count / Countess

Baron / Baroness

Crown of Nobility

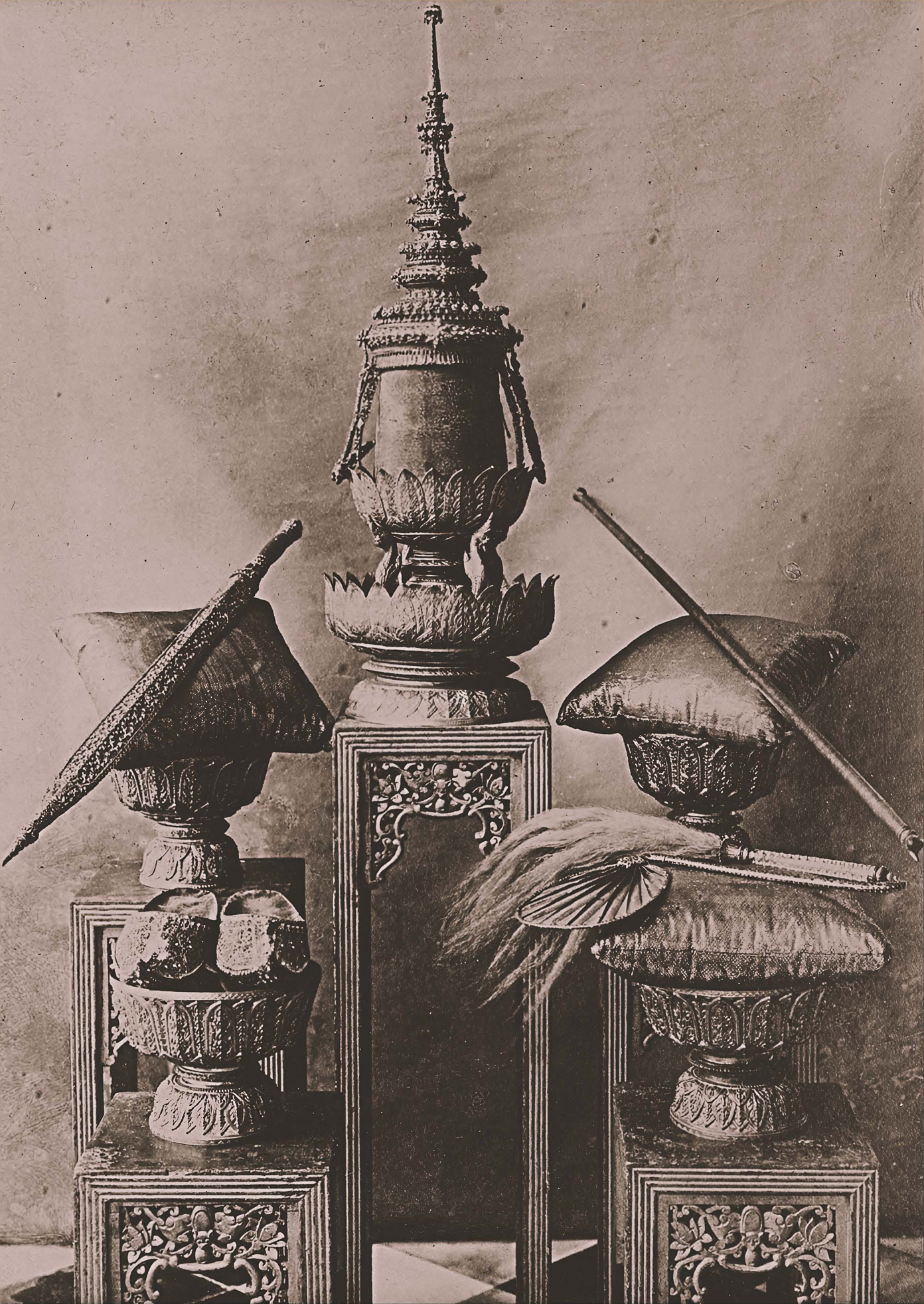
The five items of the Royal Regalia of Thailand. The Great Crown of Victory is displayed on top of this photograph.

== Former monarchies ==
=== Kingdom of France ===
The hierarchy among the French nobility, which was identical for non-royal titles to the British hierarchy of peers, should not be understood to be as rigid in the ranking of titleholders as the latter. In particular, a title was not a good indication of actual preeminence or precedence: ancestry, marriages, high office, military rank and the family's historical renown counted far more than the precise title. Some distinguished families held a title no higher than count or even baron, but were proud of their ancient origin. Moreover, most of the nobility was legally untitled. Some hereditary titles could be acquired by a nobleman who purchased a "titled" fief, while titres de courtoisie ('courtesy titles') were freely assumed in the absence of strict regulation by the French crown and became more numerous than titles legally borne. In the 17th and 18th centuries, people assumed and used freely coronets of ranks that they did not have; and, in the 19th and 20th centuries abuse was still made of 'courtesy titles'. Titles continued to be granted until the Second Empire fell in 1870, and legally survive among their descendants.

The only title that was never usurped under the ancien régime, and rarely without some excuse afterwards, was the title of duc – because it was so often attached to the rank of peer of France, which carried specific legal prerogatives, such as the right to a seat in the Parlement of Paris. As a result, the title of duc was actually, as well as nominally, at the top of the scale after the royal family and foreign princes, and a cut above all of the other nobility. During the ancien régime, 'prince' was a rank, not a title, hence there was no coronet.

French coronets

- Roi (sovereign): closed crown of fleurs-de-lis (the crown was open until the early 16th century)
- Dauphin (heir apparent): initially an open crown of fleurs-de-lis; starting with Henri IV's son (1601–10), the crown is closed with dolphins instead of arches
- Fils de France and Petit-fils de France (sons and grandsons of a sovereign): open coronet of fleurs-de-lis
- Prince du sang (male-line descendants of a grandson of the sovereign): originally an open coronet alternating fleurs-de-lis and acanthus leaves (called strawberry leaves in English blazon), but the open coronet of fleurs-de-lis was used in the 17th and 18th centuries
- Pair de France (peer of the realm): coronet of the title (usually duke) with a blue velvet bonnet, along with a mantle armoyé (reproducing the arms) fringed with gold and lined with ermine
- Duc (duke): coronet of acanthus leaves
- Marquis (marquess): coronet of alternating acanthus leaves and groups of three pearls in trefoil (or two pearls side by side in some versions)
- Comte (count): coronet of pearls
- Vicomte (viscount): coronet of four large pearls (three visible) alternating with smaller pearls
- Vidame (peculiar French title, for protectors of the temporal estates of a bishopric): coronet of four crosses (three visible)
- Baron: helm of gold wreathed with a string of small pearls
- Chevalier (knight): helm of gold
- Ecuyer (squire): helm
Roi

Dauphin

Fils de France
Petit-fils de France

Prince du sang

Duc (peer)

Duc

Marquis (peer)

Marquis

Comte (peer)

Comte

Comte (older variant)

Vicomte

Vidame

Baron

Chevalier

=== Holy Roman Empire ===
The Holy Roman Empire, and consequently its successor states (Austria, Germany and others), had a system very similar to that of the British, although the design varied.

- Herzogskrone: the coronet of a Herzog (duke) displays five visible leaves, with a crimson bonnet on top, surmounted by five visible arches and a globus cruciger.
- Fürstenkrone: the coronet of a Fürst (ruling prince) shows five visible leaves, with a crimson bonnet on top, surmounted by three visible arches and a globus cruciger.
- Landgrafenkrone: the coronet of a Landgraf (landgrave) shows five visible leaves, surmounted by three visible arches and a globus cruciger.
- Grafenkrone: the coronet of a Graf (count) displays nine visible tines with pearls. Some of the senior comital houses used coronets showing five leaves and four pearls (some mediatized counties and minor principalities had other types of coronets that distinguished them from regular counts).
- Freiherrnkrone: the coronet of a Freiherr (baron) shows seven visible tines with pearls.
- Adelskrone: the coronet of Adel members (untitled nobility) displays five visible tines with pearls. Sometimes, the central and outer tines are leaves and the other tines are headed by pearls. In the southern states of Bavaria and Württemberg, usually all tines are headed by pearls.
Herzogskrone

Fürstenkrone

Landgrafenkrone

Grafenkrone

Freiherrnkrone

Adelskrone

Considering the religious nature of the Holy Roman Empire, one can say that, except for the short-lived Napoleonic states, no continental secular system of heraldry historically was so neatly regulated as under the British crown. Still, there are often traditions (often connected to the Holy Roman Empire, e.g., those in Sweden, Denmark or Russia) that include the use of crown and coronets. While most languages do not have a specific term for coronets, but simply use the word meaning crown, it is possible to determine which of those crowns are for peerage or lower-level use, and thus can by analogy be called coronets.

Precisely because there are many traditions and more variation within some of these, there is a plethora of continental coronet types. Indeed, there are also some coronets for positions that do not exist or entitle one to a coronet in the Commonwealth tradition. Such a case in French (ancien, i.e., royal era) heraldry, where coronets of rank did not come into use before the 16th century, is the vidame, whose coronet (illustrated) is a metal circle mounted with three visible crosses (there is no documentary or archaeological evidence that such a coronet was ever made).

Often, coronets are substituted by helmets, or only worn on a helmet.

==== Austro-Hungarian Monarchy ====
In Austria-Hungary, coronets were usually granted with arms, but sometimes a coronet was not granted.

Royal crown

Archduke

Duke

Prince

Count

Baron (pre-1862)

Baron (post-1862)

Noble

=== Kingdom of Portugal ===
These coronets (Portuguese: coronéis, singular: coronel) and crowns (Portuguese: coroas, singular: coroa) were used in Portuguese heraldry:

Royal Crown of Portugal

Prince Royal (Heir Apparent)

Prince of Beira
(Heir Apparent's eldest son)

Infante (Prince)

Duke

Marquis

Count

Viscount

Baron

Knight / Fidalgo

== See also ==
- Polos
- Corolla (headgear)
- Tiara
- Crown (heraldry)
- Phra kiao
- For higher clergy such as cardinals, bishops and abbots, the corresponding headdress would be, depending on the occasion and the point during the service, a miter, zucchetto (skullcap), biretta, and the galero, which still appears on their coats of arms

== Sources and external links ==
- The Coronets of Members of the Royal Family and of the Peerage
- Heraldica.org French heraldry
- Illustration of the coat of arms of the Duke of Norfolk, showing the design of coronet
- Illustration of the coat of arms of the Earl of Annandale and Hartfell, showing the design of coronet
- The Crowns, Coronets and Crests of the Ladies and Knights of the Garter
