= Lord of Alconchel =

Lordship of Alconchel
- Creation date: 31 October 1445
- Created by: John II
- Peerage: Peerage of Spain
- First holder: Gutierre de Sotomayor, 1st Lord of Alconchel
- Present holder: Juan de la Cruz Melgar y Escoriaza, 6th Lord of Alconchel

Lord of Alconchel (Spanish: Señor de Alconchel) is a hereditary title in the Peerage of Spain, granted in 1445 by John II to Gutierre de Sotomayor, Grand master of the Order of Alcántara. The title makes reference to Alconchel, a town in Badajoz.

== Lords of Alconchel (1445) ==
- Gutierre de Sotomayor, 1st Lord of Alconchel
- Juan de Sotomayor, 2nd Lord of Alconchel
- Gutierre de Sotomayor, 3rd Lord of Alconchel
- Juan de Sotomayor, 4th Lord of Alconchel
- Bernardino Melgar y Abreu, 5th Lord of Alconchel
- Juan de la Cruz Melgar y Escoriaza, 6th Lord of Alconchel

== See also ==
- List of lords in the peerage of Spain
