= Nogales, Badajoz =

Coordinates: 38°35′46″N 6°54′26″W

Nogales
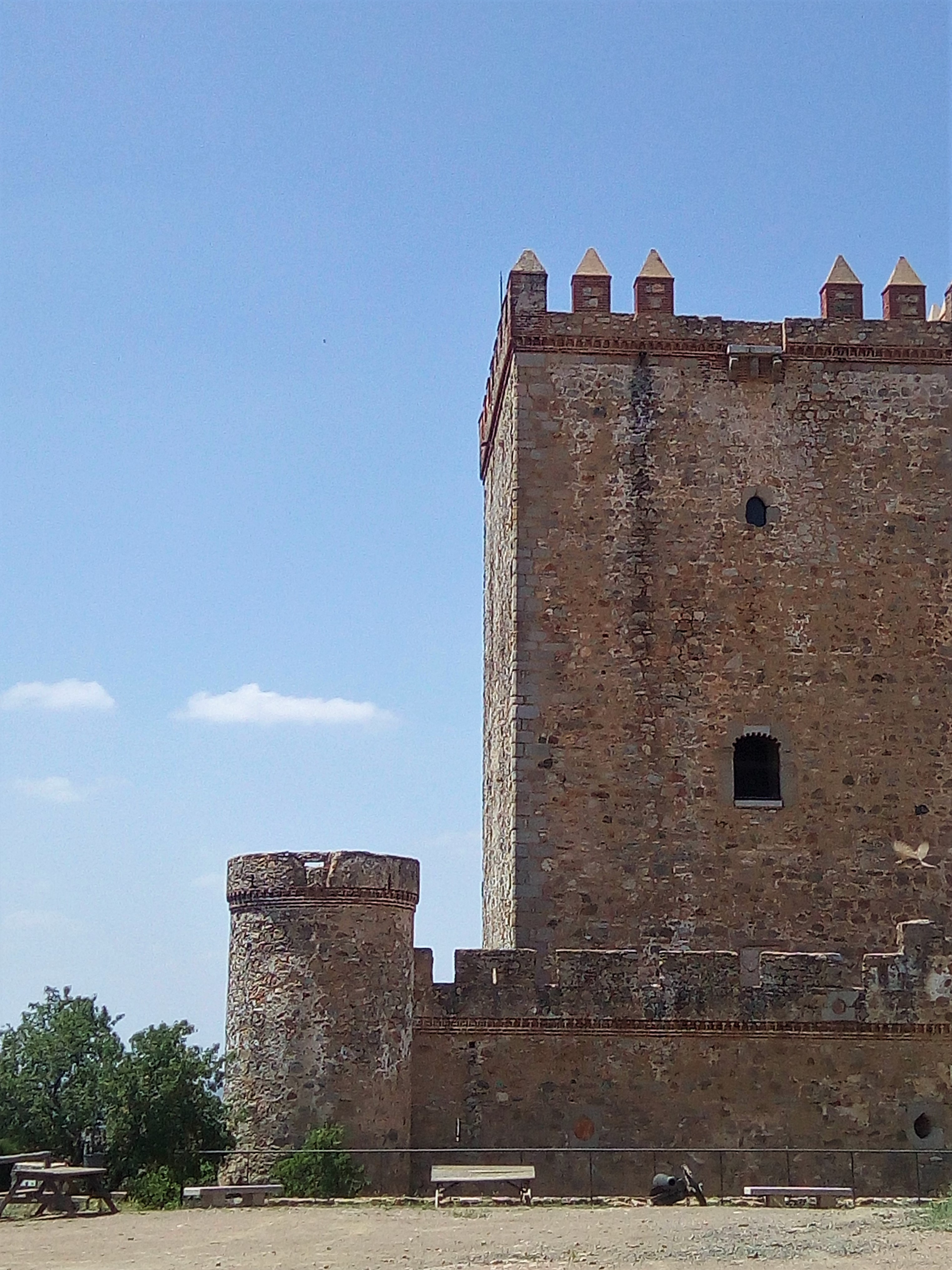
- Nogales Castle

- Flag Coat of arms
- Interactive map of Nogales
- Country: Spain
- Autonomous community: Extremadura
- Province: Badajoz
- Comarca: Llanos de Olivenza

Government
  - Alcaldesa: María de la Concepción Sayago Felipe

Area
  - Total: 80.7 km^{2} (31.2 sq mi)
- Elevation: 672 m (2,205 ft)

Population (2025-01-01)
  - Total: 632
- Time zone: UTC+1 (CET)
  - Summer (DST): UTC+2 (CEST)
- Website: Ayuntamiento de Nogales

Nogales is a Spanish municipality in the province of Badajoz, Extremadura. It has a population of 692 (2007) and an area of 80.7 km^{2} (31.2 sq mi).

== See also ==
- List of municipalities in Badajoz
