= Bartolomé de Torres Naharro =

Spanish writer (1485–1530)

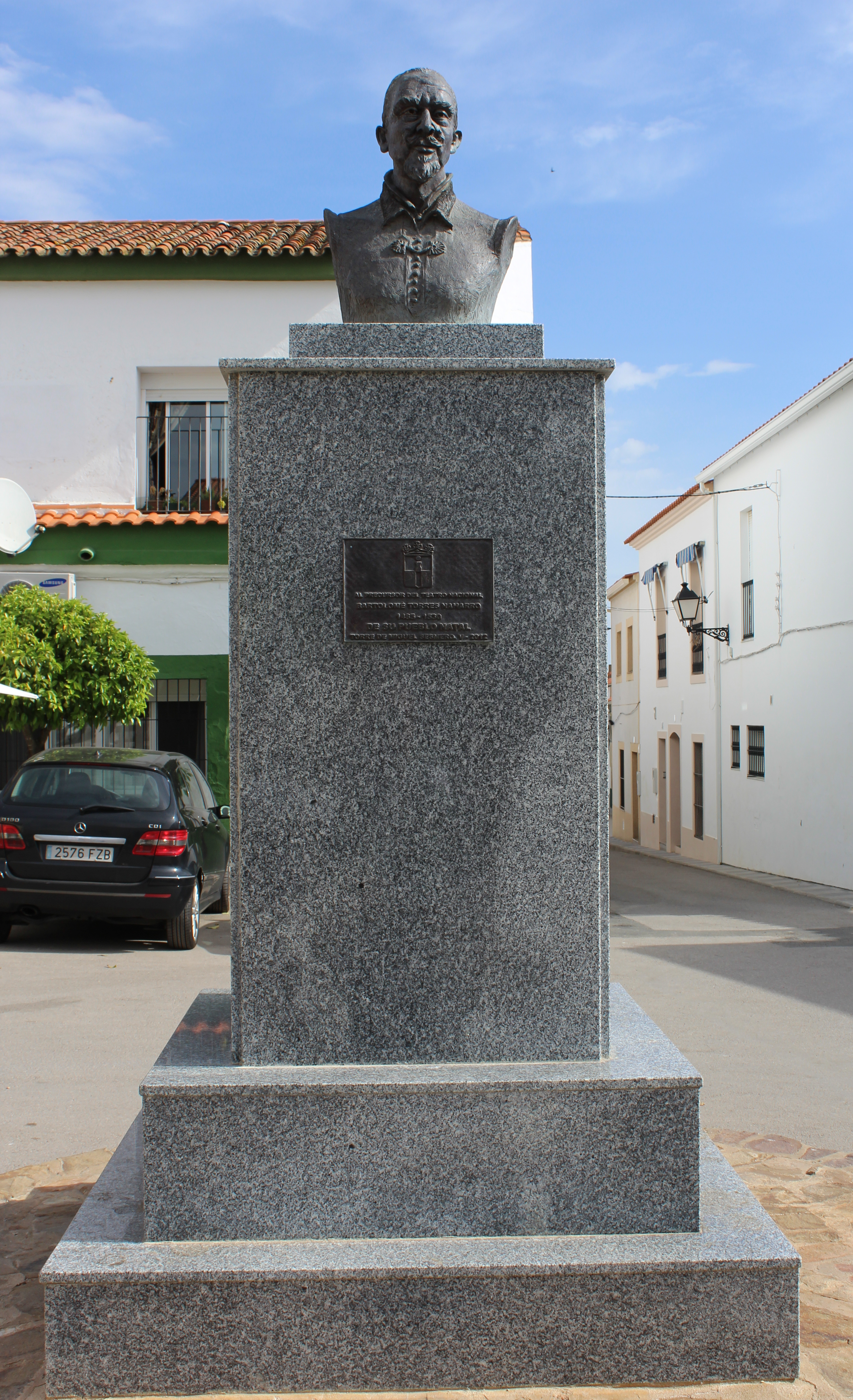
- Torres Naharro memorial statue in his hometown
- Born: 1485; Torre de Miguel Sesmero, Extremadura
- Died: 1530 (aged 44–45); Torre de Miguel Sesmero, Extremadura?
- Education: University of Salamanca
- Occupation: Dramatist
- Notable work: Propaladia

Bartolomé de Torres Naharro (c. 1485, Torre de Miguel Sesmero, Extremadura – c. 1530) was a Spanish dramatist and Leonese language writer of Jewish converso descent.

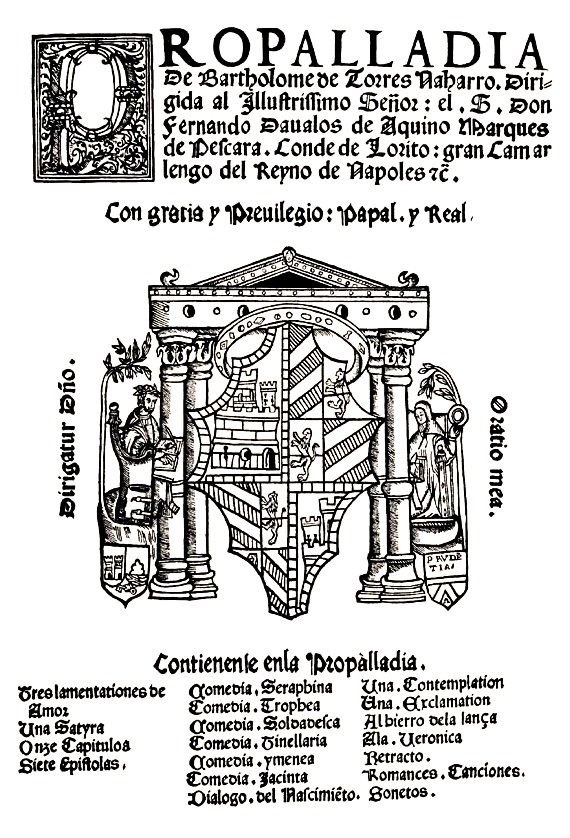
Propalladia

== Life ==
After some years of soldiering and of captivity in Algiers, Torres Naharro took holy orders, settled in Rome about 1511, and there devoted himself chiefly to writing plays. Though he alludes to the future pope, Clement VII, as his protector, he left Rome to enter the household of Fabrizio Colonna at Naples as a chaplain where his works were printed under the title of Propaladia (1517). He is conjectured to have returned to his native place, and to have died there shortly after 1529.

His Diálogo del nacimiento is written in unavowed, though obvious, imitation of other Leonese language writers as Juan del Encina, but in his subsequent plays he shows a much larger conception of dramatic possibilities. He classifies his pieces as comedias á noticia and comedias á fantasía; the former, of which the Soldatesca and Tinellaria are examples, present in dramatic form incidents within his personal experience; the latter, which include such plays as Serafina, Himenea, Calamita and Aquilana, present imaginary episodes with adroitness and persuasiveness.

According to an evaluation in the 1911 Encyclopædia Britannica:

Torres Naharro is much less dexterous in stagecraft than many inferior successors, his humour is rude and boisterous and his diction is unequal; but to a varied knowledge of human nature he adds knowledge of dramatic effect, and his rapid dialogue, his fearless realism and vivacious fancy prepared the way for the romantic drama in Spain.

Only one complete copy of the Propaladia is known to exist. This book was stolen from the Royal Danish Library in the seventies and was not seen again until it turned up at an auction at Christie's in 2003 where relatives of the original thief tried to sell it.
