= Viscount of Almocadén =

Viscountcy of Almocadén
- Creation date: 21 June 1926
- Created by: Alfonso XIII
- Peerage: Peerage of Spain
- First holder: Manuel Domecq y Núñez de Villavicencio, 1st Viscount of Almocadén
- Present holder: Sofía Bolín y Domecq, 6th Viscountess of Almocadén

Viscount of Almocadén (Spanish: Vizconde de Almocadén) is a hereditary title in the Peerage of Spain, granted in 1926 by Alfonso XIII to Manuel Domecq y Núñez de Villavicencio, main promoter of the sherry wine market. The title makes reference to Pago de Almocadén, an area situated in Jerez de la Frontera.

== Viscounts of Almocadén (1926) ==
- Manuel Domecq y Núñez de Villavicencio, 1st Viscount of Almocadén
- Pedro Francisco Domecq y González, 2nd Viscount of Almocadén
- Pedro Domecq y Zurita, 3rd Viscount of Almocadén
- Manuel Alfonso Domecq y Zurita, 4th Viscount of Almocadén
- Mercedes Domecq y Zurita, 5th Viscountess of Almocadén
- Sofía Bolín y Domecq, 6th Viscountess of Almocadén

== See also ==
- List of viscounts in the peerage of Spain
