= Lord of Sonseca =

Hereditary royal title

Lordship of Sonseca
- Creation date: 1650
- Created by: Philip IV
- Peerage: Peerage of Spain
- First holder: Duarte Fernández de Acosta, 1st Lord of Sonseca
- Present holder: Santiago García y Boscá, 5th Lord of Sonseca

Lord of Sonseca (Spanish: Señor de Sonseca) is a hereditary title in the Peerage of Spain, granted in 1650 by Philip IV to Duarte Fernández de Acosta.

== Lords of Sonseca (1650) ==
- Duarte Fernández de Acosta, 1st Lord of Sonseca
- Luis Beltrán de Lis y Espinosa de los Monteros, 2nd Lord of Sonseca
- Santiago García y Beltrán de Lis, 3rd Lord of Sonseca
- Santiago García y Janini, 4th Lord of Sonseca
- Santiago García y Boscá, 5th Lord of Sonseca

== See also ==
- List of lords in the peerage of Spain
