= Torre de Miguel Sesmero =

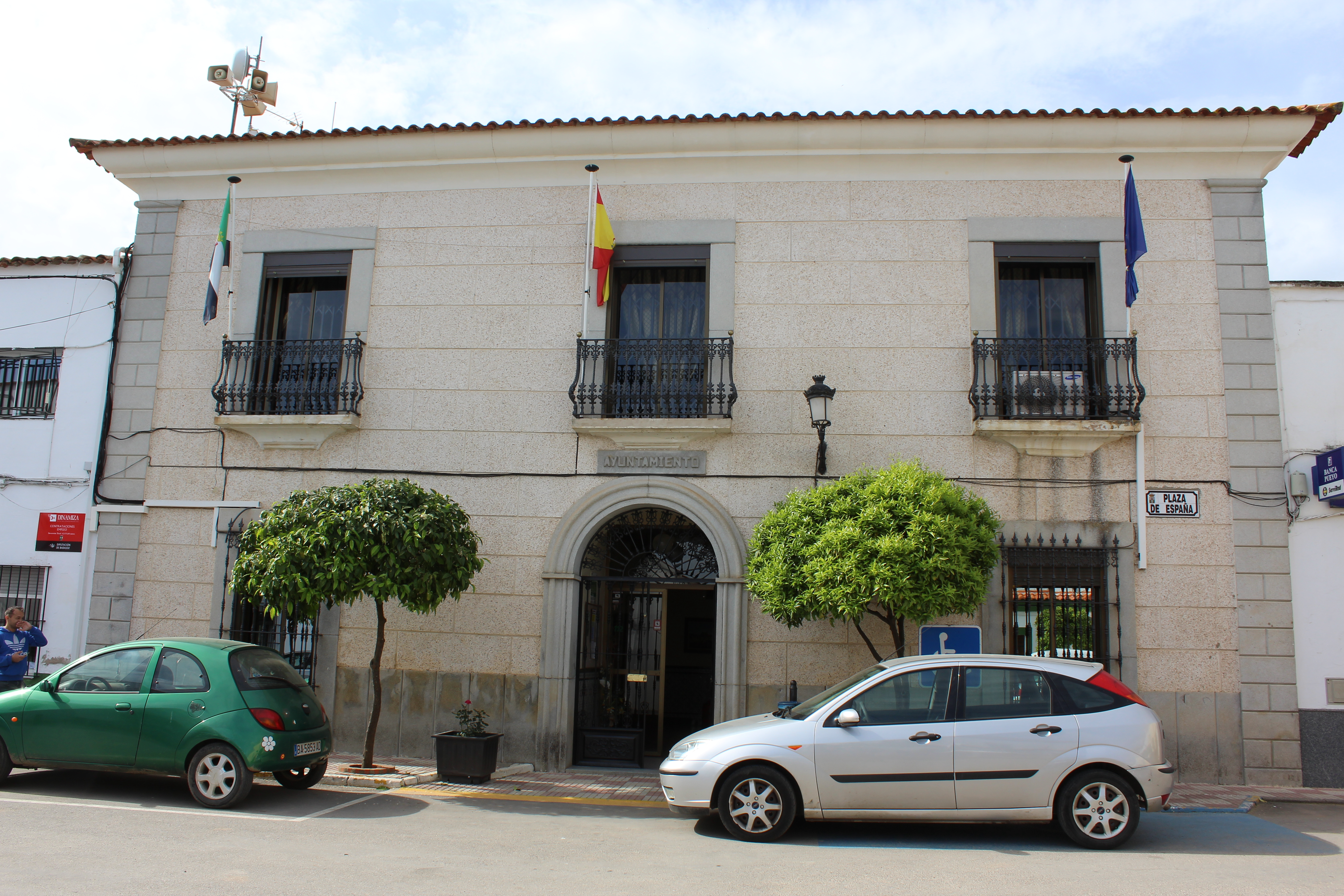
- Town hall

- Coat of arms
- Interactive map of Torre de Miguel Sesmero
- Coordinates: 38°37′N 6°48′W
- Country: Spain
- Autonomous community: Extremadura
- Province: Badajoz
- Municipality: Torre de Miguel Sesmero

Area
  - Total: 58 km^{2} (22 sq mi)
- Elevation: 324 m (1,063 ft)

Population (2025-01-01)
  - Total: 1,234
  - Density: 21/km^{2} (55/sq mi)
- Time zone: UTC+1 (CET)
  - Summer (DST): UTC+2 (CEST)
- Website: Ayuntamiento

Torre de Miguel Sesmero is a municipality located in the province of Badajoz, Extremadura, Spain (Europe).

Currently being built in a large area of the municipality, is the second biggest solar-thermal plant in Europe. These people contribute greatly to renewable energy activities to help preserve the environment.

Located on Ruta de las Cruces (Itinerary Crosses), designed to raise awareness of the chapels, churches and religious buildings built on the region's Llanos de Olivenza. It is within the Judicial District of Olivenza.

== History ==
The origin of Torre de Miguel Sesmero, could be Celtic, giving it the name Saluxtogi 2,600 years ago. Later there was a Roman settlement giving rise to another name: Turrilux.

The stories say that the town's name was due to a tower built to defend the people in the wars against Portugal. Subsequent to these conflicts, the town was deserted.

They also say that in medieval times, Don Miguel Pico found a buried treasure and given that Don Miguel was a sexmero (land dealer), they named it in his honor when the town was repopulation. In 1531 there were only 332 inhabitants.

The origin of the name, may also relate to a tower located between two village houses at the edge of the square, which was part of a fort that was demolished around 1841.

It was formerly called Torre de Almendral, as it depended on the neighboring town. The two towns fought a war in the 7th century, of which little documentation exists.

It was founded in the 14th century, around the year 1392 and this is when it is given the name Torre de Miguel Sesmero. Documents have been found confirming that the village land belonged to the Bishop of Badajoz.

The designation of Villa was awarded in 1635 upon payment of 11,000 ducats Felipe IV and in 1465 joined with Almendral the Ducado de Feria.

Between the months of September to October 1643, the Portuguese troops under the command of the Duke of Obidos, wanted to besiege Badajoz, but decided to abandon their efforts there and to wipe out some border towns, including Torre de Miguel Sesmero. A state of fear throughout the area caused many villagers to leave the village and the surrounding region.

At the fall of the Francisco Franco's dictatorship the locality is in county constitutional in the region of Extremadura. From 1834 was integrated into the Judicial District of Olivenza.

In the census of 1842 it had 259 households and 970 residents.

Notably, Torre de Miguel Sesmero had one of the First Workers' Congresses and in 1902 there were labour strikes in aid of work improvements.

Home to a major focus of federal Republicans have been the book of Manuel Díaz Ordóñez and Maria Jesus Milan Agudo, Press and rural republicanism in Badajoz twentieth century. Memory chips.. Publications Department of the Diputación de Badajoz, Badajoz. 2009. ISBN 978-84-7796-191-8. VIII awarded the prize Arturo Barea (2008).

Vicente Navarro del Castillo reported 14 inhabitants of Torre de Miguel Sesmero left for the conquest of America, among them being the most important Bartolomé Martínez Menacho, who held the following positions: - Vicar of the cathedral chapter of Lima ( Peru), Bishop of Panama and the archbishop of Santa Fe de Bogota (Colombia).

=== The conquest of America ===
Many villagers traveled to America in the early days of discovery.

- Pedro Benitez, son of Alonso Durán and María Alonso. He had a license to travel to India on April 12, 1527.
- Juan de Cabal, son of Juan Gallego and Catalina Pérez. He had a license to go to India on August 18, 1517.
- Pedro Carvajal, son of Christopher and Catherine Perez Carvajal. Was very poor. Went to Mexico and married a daughter of Bartholomew Stewart, niece of Alonso Stewart. In 1547 he thought moving to Peru with his wife and two children, then tried to do in Guatemala and was not allowed.
- Alonso Gallego, 36 years old, went to Costa Rica in issuing Artieda Diego in 1575.
- Alonso Gonzalez, son of Gonzalo Martín Garnamete and Maria Alonso. He had the permission to go to Santo Domingo on September 15, 1536.
- Martin Gutierrez, 25 years old, went to Costa Rica in issuing Artieda Diego in 1575.

== Landmarks ==
- Parish Church Nuestra Señora de la Candelaria. It was built by masters of Zafra in the late 16th century on a previous one of Templar origin, because in it there are two stone doorways bricked up on bricks placed in the XIV.
- Chapel of the Holy Christ of Mercy. Near the church, Moorish origin.
- Chapel of San Isidro. Modern style, built on a previous call of the Holy Spirit, in which land was the old cemetery.
- Ermita de la Langosta. There is a legend that says that this shrine is said divine intervention to undo a plague that was devastating to the fields.
- Cross Almendral 16th century. Stone monument at the top represents a cross. Located in the west end of town, formerly the closest point to Almendral and post arrival of ancient processions which started from this village, hence its name.
- Turret. Near the church there was a fort which was demolished in 1841. Currently remains a tower between the houses.
- Olive Oil Mill. Built in the eighteenth century was built by Bishop Murphy Malaguilla for devout Carmelite convent of Badajoz, which is often mistaken for a convent.
- Lagoons. Laguna Grande and El carril: Located in the vicinity, belonging to the Albuera lagoon system. In ancient times used to be a fishing, livestock watering and walking.
- Fountains, Albercones and Streams. The major sources are mainly two: one located in the Village Square and another source in the NE part of town, and 4 smaller tubes. Notably Hawk Creek, which runs through the eastern fringe of the town.

== Notable residents ==
- Bartolomé Martínez Menacho, Bishop of Panama and the Archbishop of Bogotá
- Bartolomé Torres Naharro, writer of the Spanish Golden Age
- Juan Barjola, contemporary painter artist.

== Traditions ==
- Every Christmas the town celebrates with a live nativity scene on the streets.
- Medieval Markets.
- Matanza.
- Country pilgrimages.
- Festivals.
- Amateur dramatics.

== See also ==
- List of municipalities in Badajoz
