= Louis Porion =

French politician

- Born: 1 August 1805; Amiens, Somme, France
- Died: 9 January 1858; Amiens, Somme, France
- Occupation: Politician
- Parent(s): Louis-Edme-Dominique Porion; Marie-Rosalie Robert

Louis Porion (1 August 1805 – 9 January 1858) was a French politician. He served as a member of the National Assembly from 1848 to 1851, representing Somme. He was also the mayor of Amiens from 1848 to 1851.
