= Cheles =

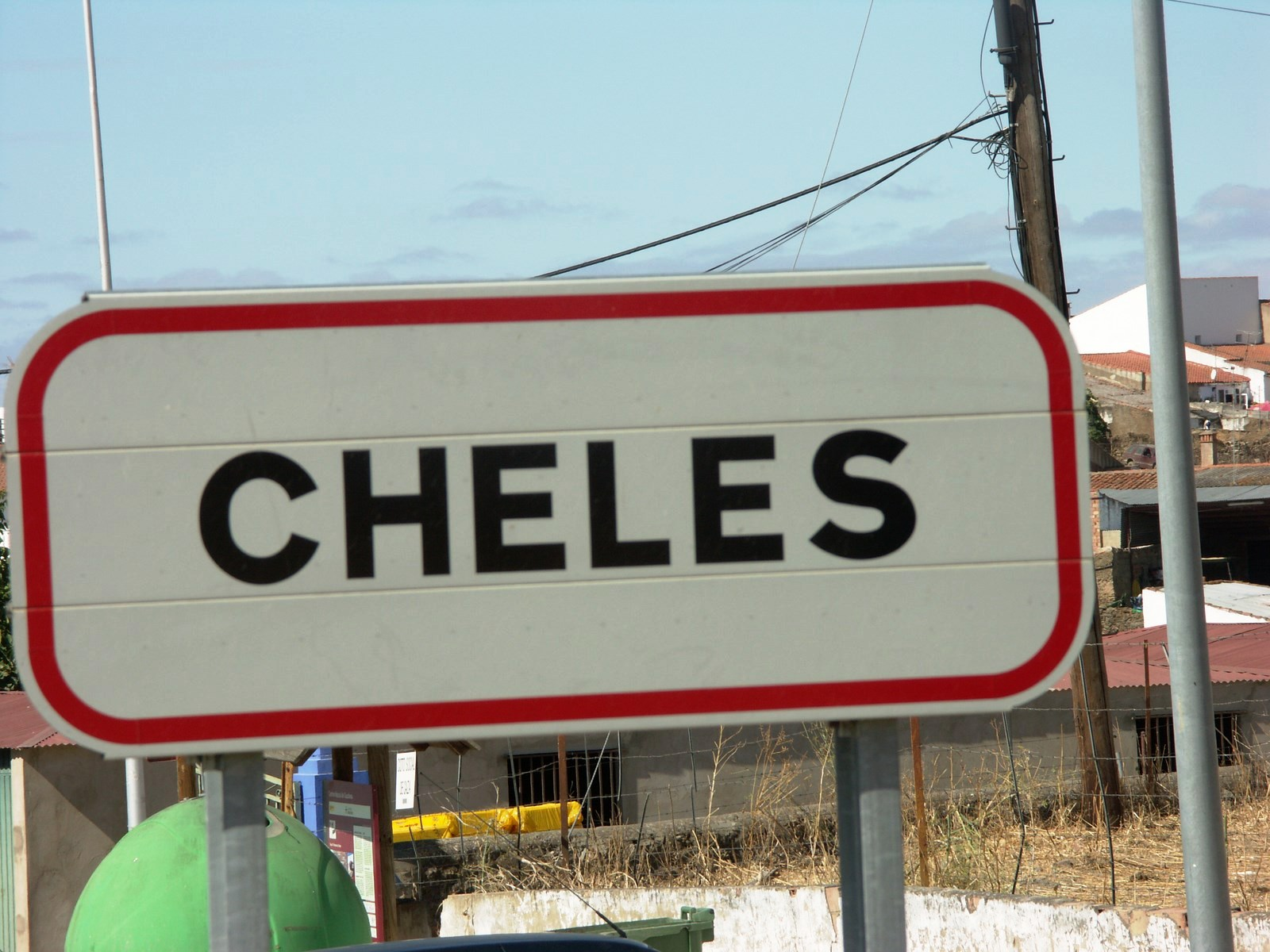

- Coat of arms

- Location of Cheles within Spain
- Coordinates: 38°30′44″N 7°16′49″W
- Country: Spain
- Autonomous community: Extremadura
- Province: Badajoz

Area
  - Total: 47 km^{2} (18 sq mi)
- Elevation: 197 m (646 ft)

Population (2025-01-01)
  - Total: 1,175
  - Density: 25/km^{2} (65/sq mi)
- Time zone: UTC+1 (CET)
  - Summer (DST): UTC+2 (CEST)

Cheles is a municipality located in the province of Badajoz, Extremadura, Spain. According to the 2005 census (INE), the municipality has a population of 1296 inhabitants.

== See also ==
- List of municipalities in Badajoz
