= Almendral =

- Municipality
- Location of Almendral within Extremadura
- Coordinates: 38°36′51″N 6°49′15″W
- Country: Spain
- Autonomous community: Extremadura
- Province: Badajoz
- Comarca: Llanos de Olivenza

Area
  - Total: 67 km^{2} (26 sq mi)

Population (2025-01-01)
  - Total: 1,202
  - Density: 18/km^{2} (46/sq mi)
- Time zone: UTC+1 (CET)
  - Summer (DST): UTC+2 (CEST)
- Website: http://almendral.dip-badajoz.es/

Almendral is a municipality located in the province of Badajoz, Extremadura, Spain. According to the 2004 census (INE), the municipality has a population of 1352 inhabitants.

== History ==
From the earliest Iberian times, passing through the Celtic, Phoenician, Greek, Carthaginian, Roman, Visigoth and Arab periods, until the middle of the 13th century, Extremadura suffered violent invasions, accusations of displacement of its first inhabitants and successive conquests that led to a state of instability and skepticism that was to be projected into the character of its future inhabitants. In any case, the primitive character was profiling and acquiring strength and identity of its own over the centuries until it was possible to establish a regional idiosyncrasy that has led it to continue to the present day.

The prehistoric essence of Lower Extremadura is linked to the various events that have been reported since the first Mediterranean invasions. According to the discoveries of ancient vestiges, it is conjectured that Almendral was populated by primitive tribes of Iberian race, since the territory between this town and Barcarrota, counts on one of the majors concentrations of megalithic tombs [4] of the Province of Badajoz.

Possible seat since the Roman period, the Visigoths should have elevated it to superior category, since in its old site, a place known as the hermitage of San Matías, have appeared a series of visigodas pieces of some archaeological value that are currently in the Museum Archaeological site of Badajoz and in the hermitage of Finibus Térrae.

The present Almendral was founded by the Arabs, two kilometers from the old site of the church of San Matías, since the previous settlement would have been devastated by Portuguese forces when they ventured into Extremadura after the battle of Aljubarrota.

In 1333, King Alfonso XI the Justiciero handed over the town of Almendral, with all its terms and rents, to Enrique Enríquez "el Mozo", lord of Villalba de los Barros and Justice mayor of the King's House, who was the great-grandson of Fernando III the Saint, King of Castile and León.

Almendral was a village of Badajoz and was part of the Manor of Feria in the time of Gome Suárez de Figueroa. During the seventeenth century, like the other Extremadura populations near the Portuguese border, Almendral also suffered from the ups and downs of the clashes between the two nations.

To the end of Francoist Spain the locality constitutes constitutional municipality in the region of Extremadura. From 1834 was integrated in the Judicial Party of Olivenza. 1 In the census of 1842 it had 480 homes and 1,670 neighbors.

== Gallery ==
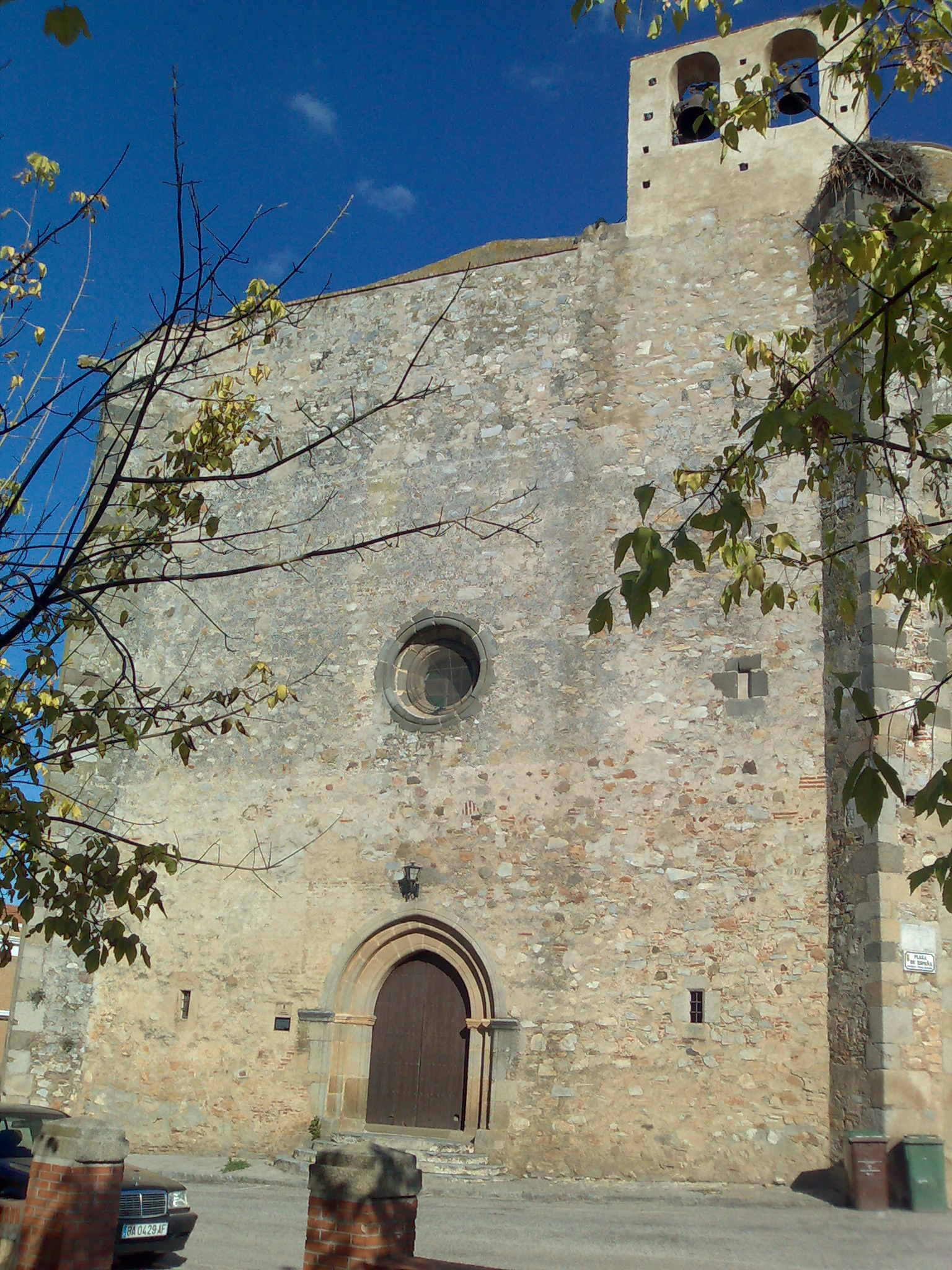

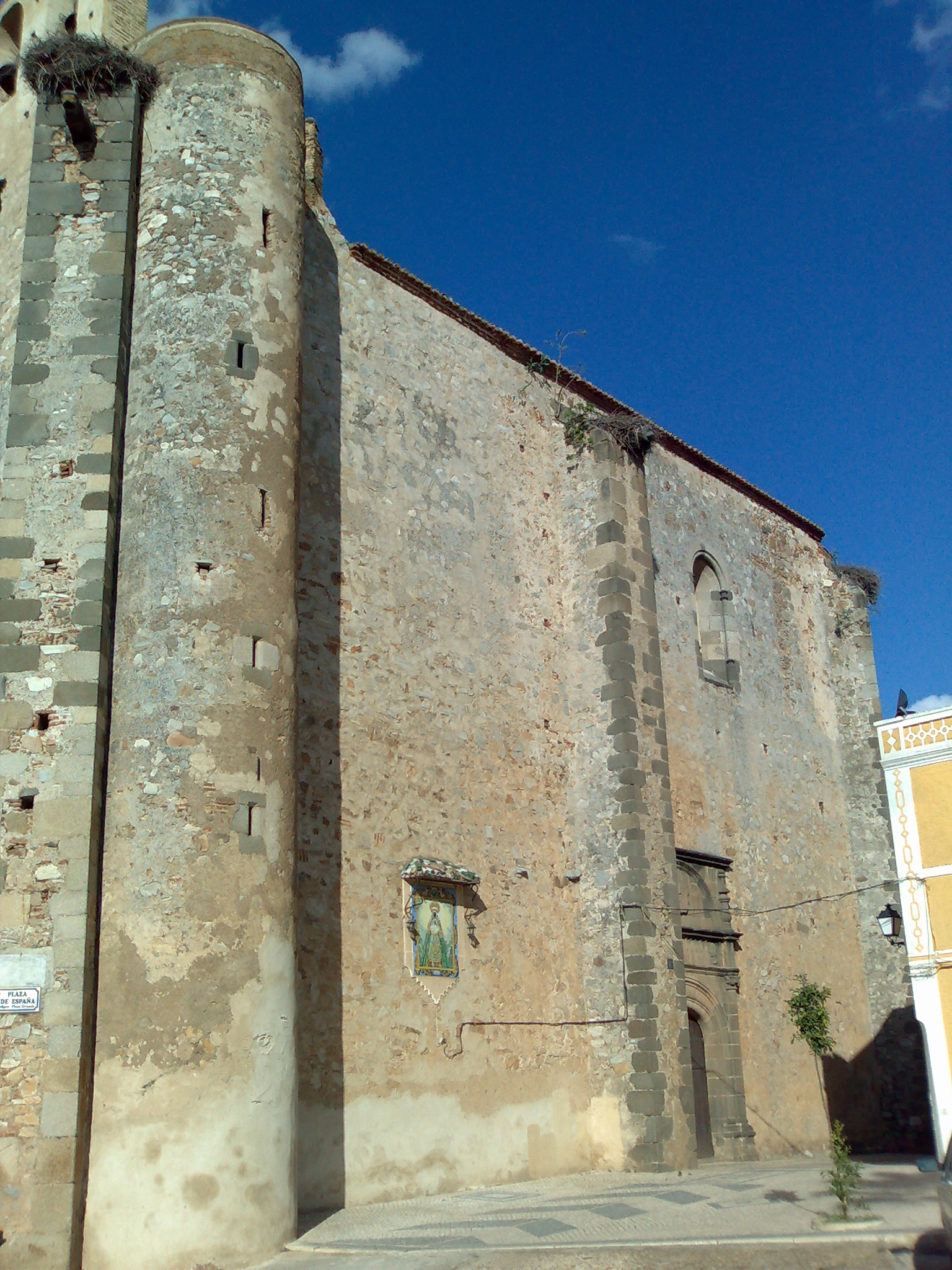

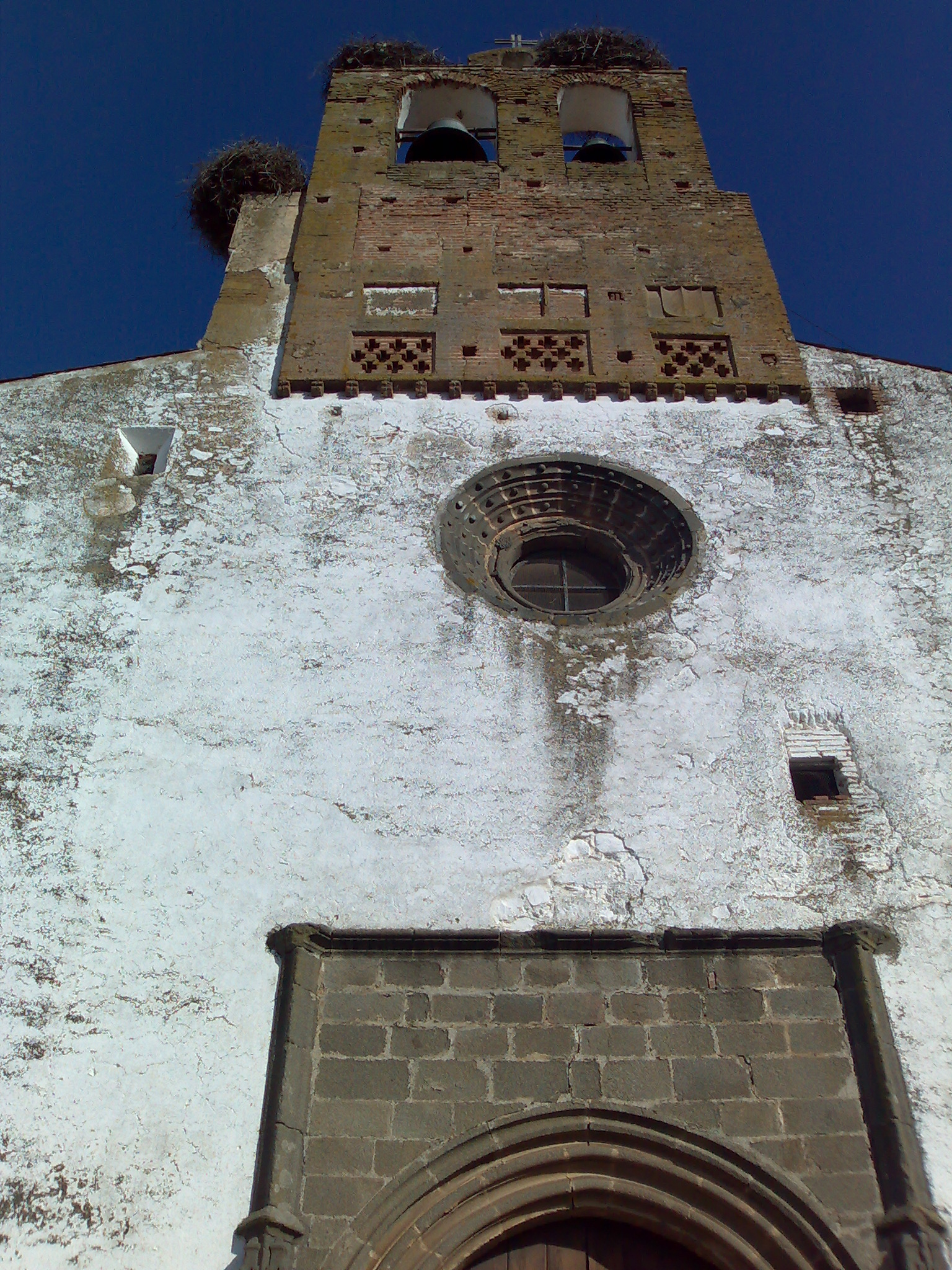

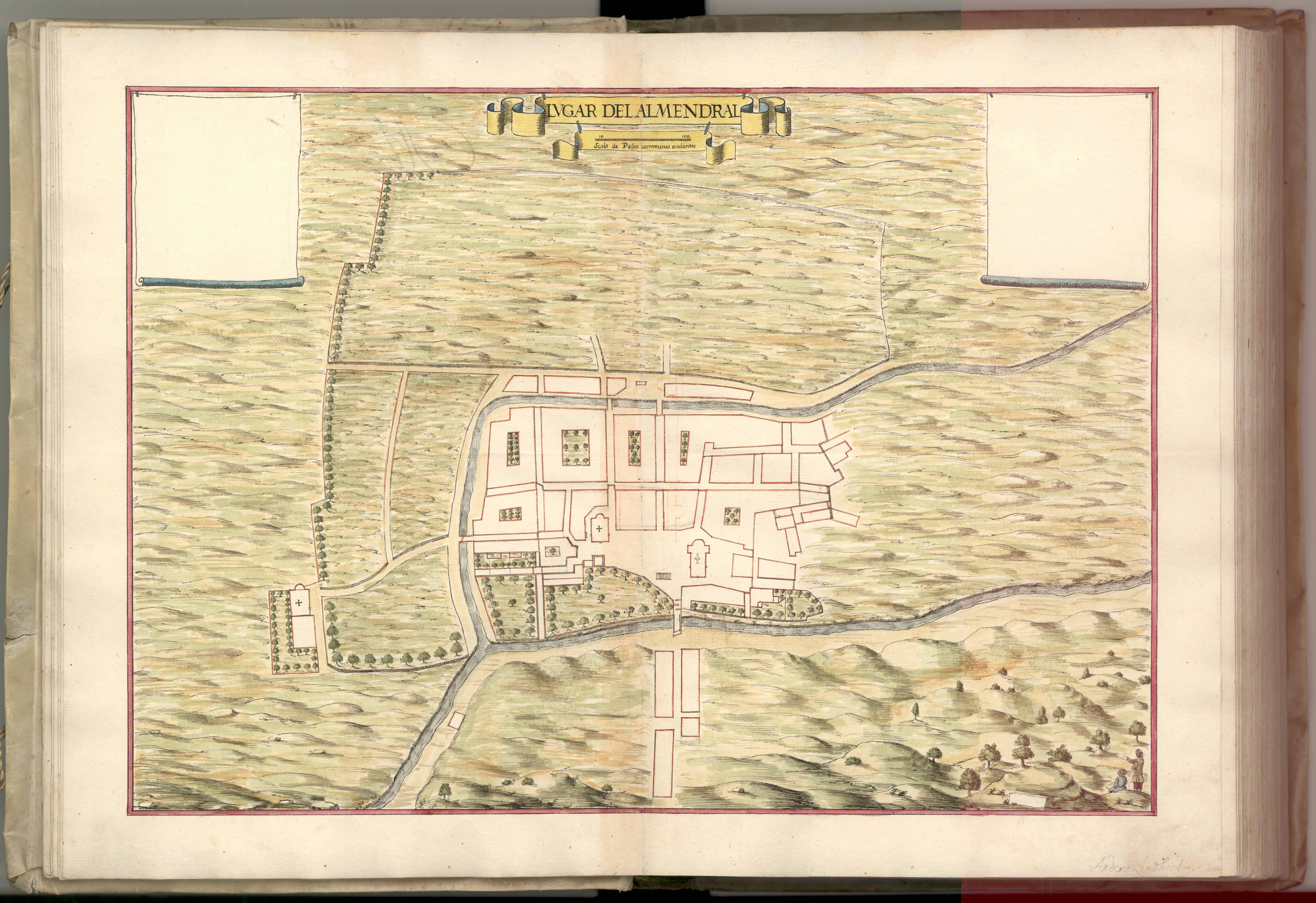

== See also ==
- List of municipalities in Badajoz
