= List of lords in the peerage of Spain =

Heraldic representation of the coronet of a Spanish lord

This is a list of the present and extant lords in the peerage of the Kingdom of Spain.

== Lords in the peerage of Spain ==
Title	Date of creation	Arms	Current holder	Houses
Lord of Alconchel	1447		Juan de la Cruz Melgar y Escoriaza	Sotomayor, Melgar
Lord of Casa Lazcano	1780		Almudena Arteaga y del Alcázar	Lazcano, Arteaga
Lord of Casa Rubianes	1535		Beatriz Ozores y Rey	Caamaño, Ozores
Lord of Higuera de Vargas	1390		Manuel Falcó y Anchorena	Vargas, Silva, Sotomayor, Gutiérrez de los Ríos, Osorio, Falcó
Lord of Sonseca	1650		Santiago García y Boscá	Acosta

== See also ==
- Spanish nobility
- List of dukes in the peerage of Spain
- List of viscounts in the peerage of Spain
- List of barons in the peerage of Spain

== Bibliography ==
- Hidalgos de España, Real Asociación de (2018). Elenco de Grandezas y Títulos Nobiliarios Españoles. Ediciones Hidalguía. ISBN 978-84-94841-02-6.
