= List of viscounts in the peerage of Spain =

Heraldic representation of the coronet of a Spanish viscount

This is a list of present and extant viscounts in the peerage of the Kingdom of Spain hold by people with Spanish citizenship.

Note that some of the titles are only used as subsidiary titles.

This list does not include extinct, dormant, abeyant, forfeited or titles of which their holder is not known.

== Viscounts in the peerage of Spain ==
Title	Date of creation	Arms	Current holder	Houses
Viscount of Áger	(1094)		Alejandro de Sambucy de Sorgue y Jou	
Viscount of Alborada	(1849)		Florencio Gavito y Mariscal	
Viscount of Alcira	(1865)		Ignacio Bertodano y Guillén	
Viscount of Alesón	(1856)		Beltrán de Morenés y Gurruchaga	
Viscount of Almocadén	(1926)		Sofía Bolín y Domecq	
Viscount of Alquerforadat	(1335)		Francisco Javier de Silva y Mora	
Viscount of Altamira de Vivero	(1473)		Rodrigo Peñalosa e Izuzquiza	
Viscount of Amaya	(1688)		Hernando de Orellana-Pizarro y González	
Viscount of Antrines	(1866)		Francisco Goicoerrotea y Sarri	
Viscount of Arberoa	(1455)		Francisco Javier González de Castejón y Larrañaga	
Viscount of Arboleda	(1849)		María de la Consolación Muñoz y Santa Marina	
Viscount of la Armería	(1694)		Fadrique Álvarez de Toledo y Argüelles	
Viscount of Ayala	(1865)		Alfonso de Ceballos-Escalera y Gila	
Viscount of Bahía Honda	(1856)		María Isabel Menchaca y Salamanca	
Viscount of Baiguer	(1033)		Lluis de Mora y Narváez	
Viscount of Banderas	(1837)		Francisco de Borja Montesino-Espartero y Velasco	
Viscount of Barrantes	(1654)		Juan Manuel Álvarez de Lorenzana y de la Pezuela	
Viscount of Barrionuevo	(1891)		Matilde Francisca Barrionuevo y Peña	
Viscount of Bas	(1285)		Victoria Elisabeth Prinzessin zu Hohenlohe-Langenburg	
Viscount of Begíjar	(1816)		Alonso Contreras y Garrido	
Viscount of Belloch	(1924)		Javier de Mercader y Rovira	
Viscount of Bellver	(1847)		Diego Llanos y Alós	
Viscount of Benaoján	(1819)		Alberto de la Lastra y Castillo	
Viscount of Bernuy	(1909)		Alberto Mencos y Valdés	
Viscount of Bétera	(1878)		Rafael de Rojas y Cárdenas	
Viscount of Bosch Labrús	(1926)		Luis Manuel de Castellví y Suárez-Rivero	
Viscount of Bruch	(1855)		David Heras y Sáez	
Viscount of Buen Paso	(1708)		Iñigo de Hoyo-Solórzano y de Ramón-Laca	
Viscount of Burguillos	(1922)		Joaquín Murillo de Saavedra y Cuesta	
Viscount of Cabanyes	(1512)		Enrique Falcó y Carrión	
Viscount of Cabrera	(1002)		Victoria Elisabeth von Hohenlohe-Langenburg	
Viscount of Caparacena	(1627)		Mauricio Álvarez de las Asturias Bohorques y Álvarez de Toledo	
Viscount of Castillo de Almansa	(1773)		José Fernando Almansa y Moreno-Barreda	
Viscount of Couserans	(1830)		Fernando España y Caamaño	
Viscount of Cuba	(1856)		Roberto-Luis Sánchez-Ocaña y Chamorro	
Viscount of Ébol	(1426)		Alejandro de Sambucy de Sorgue y Jou	
Viscount of Eza	(1711)		Pablo Marichalar y Vigier	
Viscount of Fefiñanes	(1647)		Pedro Alonso-Martínez y Casani	
Viscount of Fenollet	(1280)		Alejandro de Sambucy de Sorgue y Jou	
Viscount of Frontera	(1657)		Alfonso Egaña y Azúa	
Viscount of Güell	(1911)		Eusebio Güell y Sentmenant	
Viscount of Iznájar	(1466)		Álvaro Francisco López de Becerra de Solé y Casanova-Cárdenas	
Viscount of Jarafe	(1862)		Carmen María Soltero Pomales	
Viscount of Linares	(1628)		Victoria Elisabeth von Hohenlohe-Langenburg	
Viscount of Llanteno	(1873)		Isabelle Jacqueline Parra Stucky de Quay	
Viscount of Miranda	(1857)		Enrique Puigmoltó y Garrigues	
Viscount of Miravalles	(1847)		Germán Manuel Gamazo y Hohenlohe	
Viscount of Palma del Condado	(1929)		José María Rodríguez de Cepeda y Palma	
Viscount of Peñaparda de Flores	(1638)		José Miguel Rueda y Muñoz de San Pedro	
Viscount of Rías	(1688)		Rafael Ángel Finat y Riva	
Viscount of Rocabertí	(842)		Pedro de Piña y Cerdá	
Viscount of Rocamora	(1848)		Myriam Granzow de la Cerda y Roca de Togores	
Viscount of Santa Clara de Avedillo	(1628)		José María Yangas y Pérez de Herrasti	
Viscount of Tapia	(1873)		Juan Allendesalazar y Ruiz de Arana	
Viscount of Térmens	(1647)		José María Muñiz Von Schmiterlow	
Viscount of Tuy	(1473)		Felipe Jaime del Alcázar y Kern	
Viscount of Urgel	(1097)		Cristoph Jou y Hohenlohe-Langenburg	
Viscount of Urtx	(1081)		Alejandro de Sambucy de Sorgue y Jou	
Viscount of Villamur	(1572)		Victoria Elisabeth von Hohenlohe-Langenburg	
Viscount of Villares	(1707)		José Antonio Fernández de Córdoba y Sánchez	
Viscount of Villarubio			María Fernanda Gavito y Mariscal	
Viscount of Viota de Arba	(1457)		Federico Prat y Puigmoltó	
Viscount of Yrueste	(1718)		Mónica Figueroa y Cernuda	
Viscount of Zolina	(1518)		Luis Fernando Gómez de Silva y de Aragón	

== See also ==
- Spanish nobility
- List of dukes in the peerage of Spain
- List of barons in the peerage of Spain
- List of lords in the peerage of Spain

== Bibliography ==
- Hidalgos de España, Real Asociación de (2018). Elenco de Grandezas y Títulos Nobiliarios Españoles. Ediciones Hidalguía. ISBN 978-84-94841-02-6.
