= List of barons in the peerage of Spain =

Heraldic representation of the coronet of a Spanish baron

This is a list of the 168 present and extant barons in the peerage of the Kingdom of Spain.

== Barons in the peerage of Spain ==
Title	Date of creation	Arms	Current holder	Houses
Baron of Maabe	(1780)		María de la Consolación Vélaz de Medrano y Ureta	
Baron of Mahave	(1747)			
Baron of Abella	(1817)		Guy Yusupov	
Baron of Atzeneta	(1477)		Pablo Tamarit y Corbí	
Baron of Agres y Sella	(1527)		Isabel Calatayud y Sarthou	
Baron of Alacuas	(1627)		María Leonor Trénor y Trénor	
Baron of Albalat de Segart	(1614)		María Asunción de Saavedra y Bes	
Baron of Albi	(1755)		Carlos de Montoliú y Carrasco	
Baron of Alcácer	(1443)		Fernando Núñez-Robres y Escrivá de Romaní	
Baron of Alcalalí y San Juan de Mosquera	(1616)		Soledad Ruiz de Lihory y Sempere	
Baron of Algar del Campo	(1907)		María de la Paz López de Carrizosa y Víctor	
Baron of Algerri	(1541)		Jorge Camps y Galobart	
Baron of Almiserat	(1482)		Luis Alonso y Stuyck	
Baron of Almolda	(1417)		Bárbara de Prat y Guerrero	
Baron of Andaya	(1891)		Fabiola Fernández-Lascoiti y Franco	
Baron of Andilla			Antonio Caro y Santa Cruz	
Baron of Antella	(1568)		Francisco de Paula Faus y Escrivá	
Baron of Antillón	(1414)		Bárbara de Prat y Guerrero	
Baron of las Arenas	(1844)		Carlos del Corral y Lueje	
Baron of Ariza	(1829)		Alfonso Gallego y Anabitarte	
Baron of Ballesteros	(1407)		Fernando San Cristóbal y Pérez	
Baron of Balsareny	(1654)		Ignacio José de Alós y Martín	
Baron of Bellpuig	(1139)		Alfonso Bustos y Pardo Manuel de Villena	
Baron of Benasque	(1909)		Francisco Sáenz de Tejada y Picornell	
Baron of Benedris	(1392)		Carlos Muguiro e Ibarra	
Baron of Benidoleig	(1620)		Fernando Miquel y Benjumea	
Baron of Benifayó	(1615)		Enrique Falcó y Carrión	
Baron of Benimuslem	(1620)		Fernando Ruiz-Valarino y Rodríguez de la Encina	
Baron of Beniomer	(1905)		Marta Manglano y Puig	
Baron of Beniparrell	(1258)		Alfonso Escrivá de Romaní y Mora	
Baron of Beorlegui	(1391)		María Jesús González de Castejón y Moreno	
Baron of Bétera	(1329)		Buenaventura Patiño y Arróspide	
Baron of Bicorp	(1392)		Carlos Muguiro e Ibarra	
Baron of Bigüezal	(1631)		Joaquín Javier Londaiz y Montiel	
Baron of Blancafort	(1771)		Alfonso Moncasi y Masip	
Baron of Bonet	(1901)		Álvaro Amigó y Bengoechea	
Baron of Borriol	(1254)		Alfonso Carlos Gordón y Sanchiz	
Baron of Bugete	(1884)		José Antonio Ortenbach y Cerezo	
Baron of Callosa	(1458)		Diego Crespí de Valldaura y Cardenal	
Baron of Campo de Águilas	(1837)		Beatriz Muñoz de San Pedro y Flores de Lizaur	
Baron of Campo Olivar	(1778)		Fernando Musoles y Martínez-Curt	

== See also ==
- Spanish nobility
- List of dukes in the peerage of Spain
- List of viscounts in the peerage of Spain
- List of lords in the peerage of Spain

== Bibliography ==
- Hidalgos de España, Real Asociación de (2018). Elenco de Grandezas y Títulos Nobiliarios Españoles. Ediciones Hidalguía. ISBN 978-84-94841-02-6.
