= Alconchel =

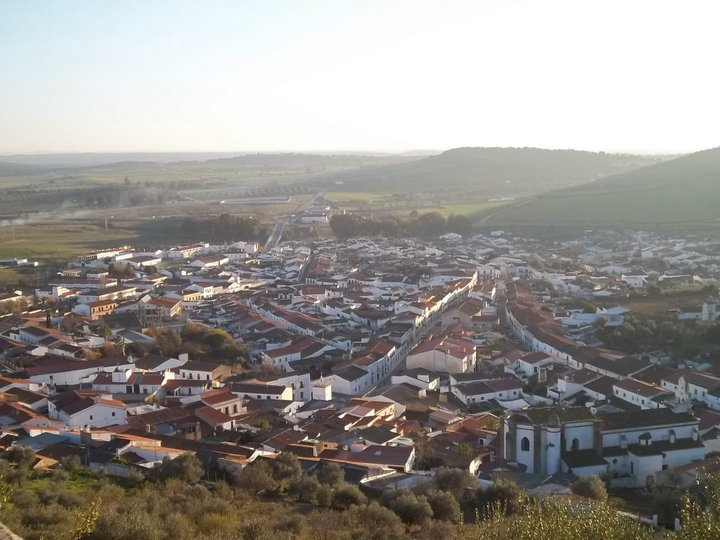

- Coat of arms

- Location of Alconchel within Extremadura
- Coordinates: 38°31′00″N 7°4′16″W
- Country: Spain
- Autonomous community: Extremadura
- Province: Badajoz
- Comarca: Llanos de Olivenza

Government
  - Alcalde: Jesús Pérez Para

Area
  - Total: 294.9 km^{2} (113.9 sq mi)

Population (2025-01-01)
  - Total: 1,592
- Time zone: UTC+1 (CET)
  - Summer (DST): UTC+2 (CEST)
- Website: Ayuntamiento de Alconchel

Alconchel is a Spanish municipality in the province of Badajoz, Extremadura. It has a population of 1,970 (2007) and an area of 294.9 km^{2} (113.9 sq mi).

== See also ==
- List of municipalities in Badajoz
