= Peerage =

System of nobility

A peerage is a legal system historically comprising various hereditary titles (and sometimes non-hereditary titles) in a number of countries, and composed of assorted noble ranks.

Peerages include:

== Australia ==
- Australian peers

== Belgium ==
- Belgian nobility

== Canada ==
- British peerage titles granted to Canadian subjects of the Crown
- Canadian nobility in the aristocracy of France

== China ==
- Chinese nobility

== France ==
- Peerage of France
- List of French peerages
- Peerage of Jerusalem

== Malta ==
- Maltese nobility

== Japan ==
- Peerage of the Empire of Japan
- House of Peers (Japan)

== Portugal ==
- Chamber of Most Worthy Peers

== Spain ==
- Chamber of Peers (Spain)
- List of dukes in the peerage of Spain
- List of viscounts in the peerage of Spain
- List of barons in the peerage of Spain
- List of lords in the peerage of Spain

== United Kingdom ==
=== Great Britain and Ireland ===
- Peerages in the United Kingdom
  - Hereditary peer, holders of titles which can be inherited by an heir
  - Life peer, members of the peerage of the United Kingdom whose titles cannot be inherited
  - Peerage of England, holders of English titles created before 1707
  - Peerage of Great Britain, holders of titles created in the Kingdom of Great Britain between 1707 and 1800
  - Peerage of Ireland, holders of Irish titles created by the Crown before 1920, until 1801 carrying a seat in the Irish House of Lords, some of whom later sat in the House of Lords at Westminster
  - Peerage of Scotland, holders of Scottish titles created before 1707, some of whom later sat in the House of Lords, all of them having a seat there from 1964 to 1999
  - Peerage of the United Kingdom, holders of most titles created since 1801 in the United Kingdom of Great Britain and Ireland (renamed United Kingdom of Great Britain and Northern Ireland after 1921)
  - Representative peers, holders of Scottish and Irish peerages who represented their peer-groups in the House of Lords at Westminster
  - Welsh peers and baronets, holders of various titles with a Welsh territorial connection
- List of dukedoms in the peerages of Britain and Ireland
- Jacobite peerage, titles created following the deposition of King James II and VII from the thrones of England, Ireland, and Scotland

=== Lists of peers ===
- Dukes: see List of dukes in the peerages of Britain and Ireland
- Marquesses: see List of marquesses in the peerages of Britain and Ireland
- Earls: see List of earls in the peerages of Britain and Ireland
- Viscounts: see List of viscounts in the peerages of Britain and Ireland
- Barons: see List of barons in the peerages of Britain and Ireland
- Female peerages: see List of peerages created for women and List of peerages inherited by women

== See also ==
- Baronage
- Pairie, French equivalent of the English word "peerage"
