= Higuera de Vargas =

- municipality
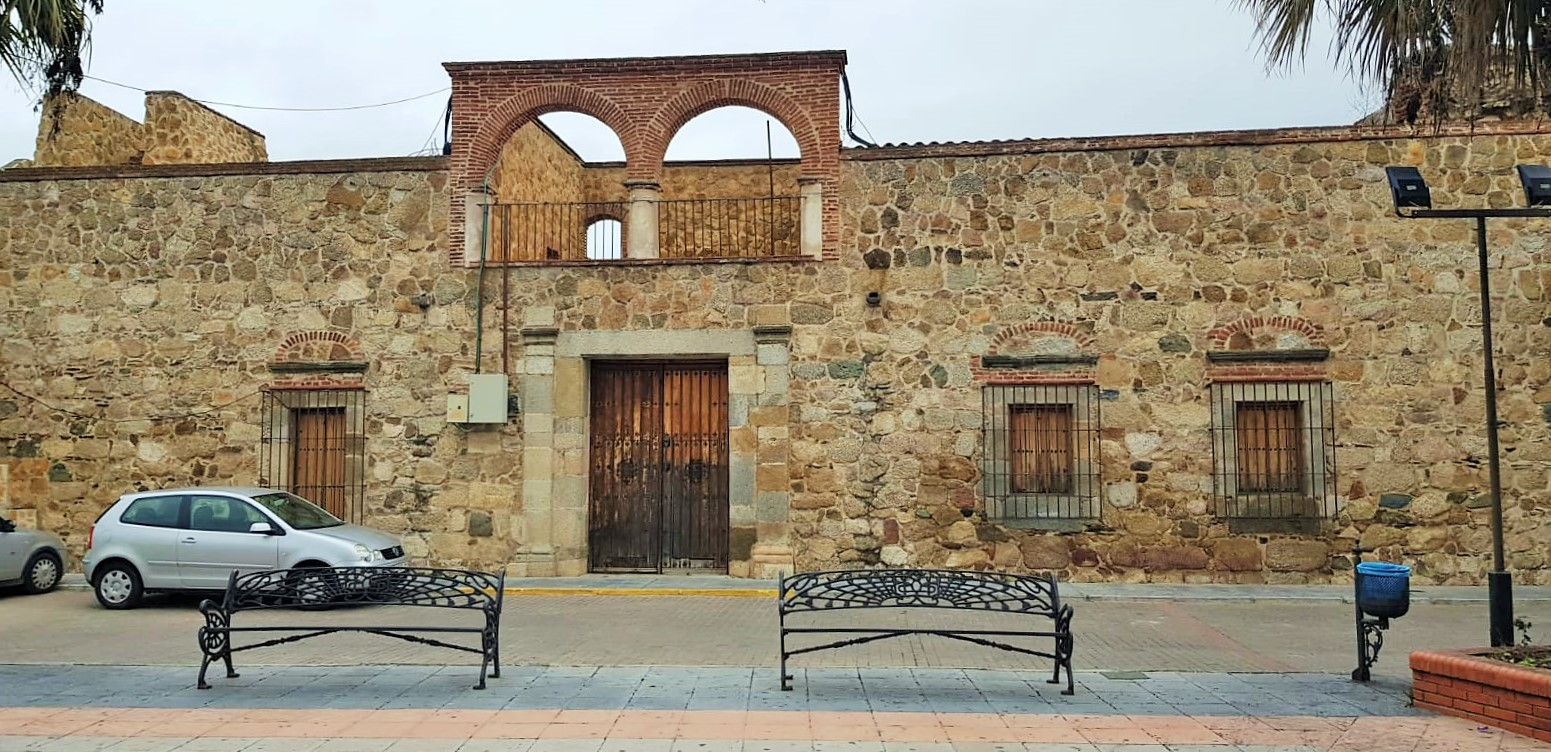

- Coat of arms

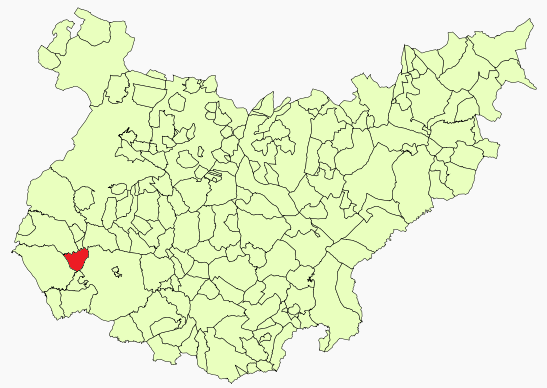
- Location in Badajoz

- Location of Higuera de Vargas within Extremadura
- Coordinates: 38°26′46″N 6°58′26″W
- Country: Spain
- Autonomous community: Extremadura
- Province: Badajoz

Area
  - Total: 67.6 km^{2} (26.1 sq mi)
- Elevation: 342 m (1,122 ft)

Population (2025-01-01)
  - Total: 1,830
  - Density: 27.1/km^{2} (70.1/sq mi)
- Time zone: UTC+1 (CET)
  - Summer (DST): UTC+2 (CEST)

Higuera de Vargas is a municipality in the province of Badajoz, Extremadura, Spain. It has a population of 2,011 and an area of 67.6 km^{2} (26.1 sq mi).

== See also ==
- List of municipalities in Badajoz
