= Charles Porion =

French painter

- Born: 1 May 1814; Amiens, Somme, France
- Died: 1908 (aged 93–94)
- Occupation: Painter

Charles Porion (1814–1908 (Note: Some other sources say "after 1868". See e.g., Porion, Charles (Museo Nacional del Prado).)) was a French painter.

== Early life ==
Charles Porion was born on 1 May 1814 in Amiens. He was trained by Michel Martin Drolling and Jean-Auguste-Dominique Ingres.

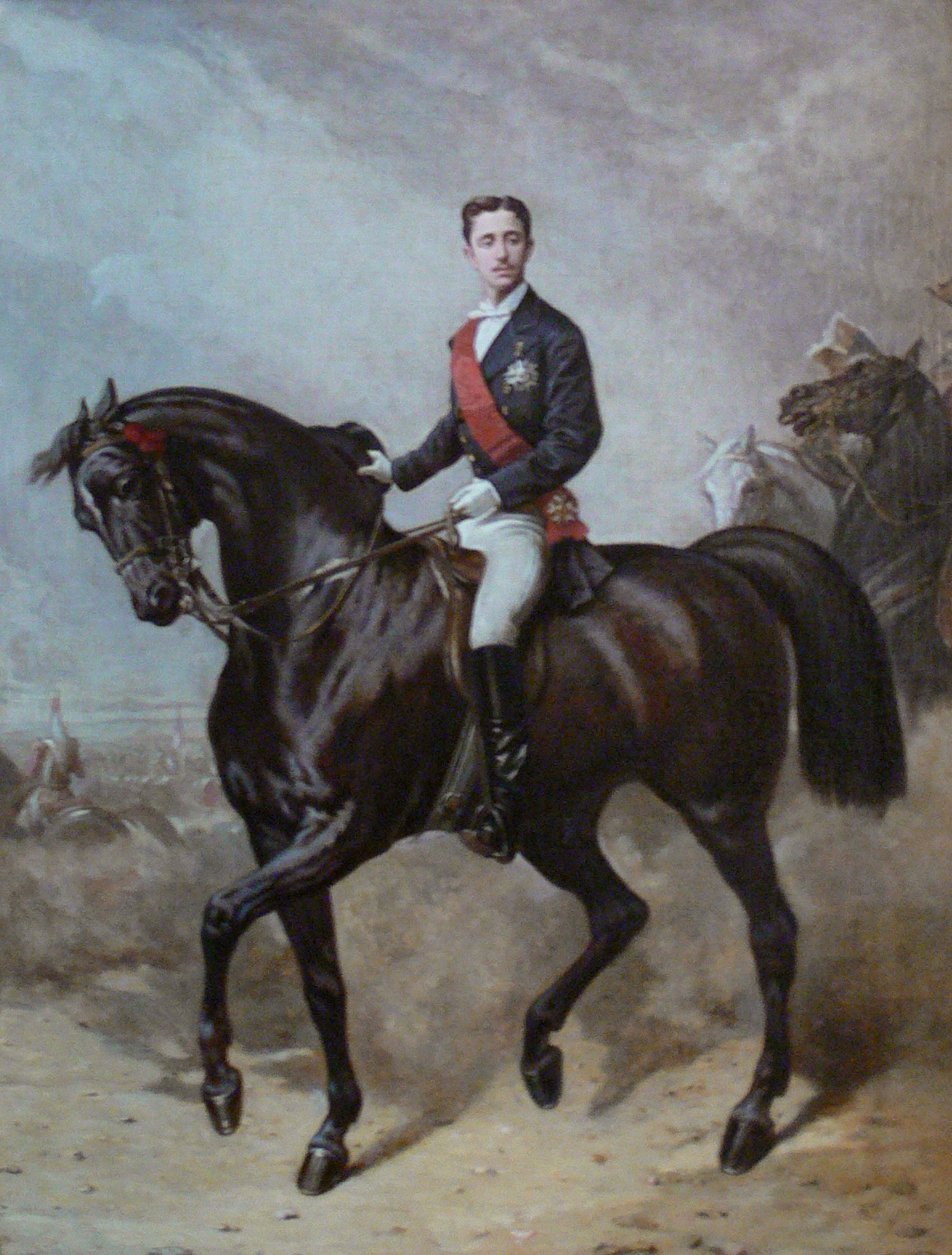
Le Prince Imperial by Porion

== Career ==
Porion was awarded second prize in the 1840 Prix de Rome competition. He exhibited at the Salon from 1844 to 1868, where he won a bronze medal in 1844. He became a knight of the Légion d'Honneur in 1884.
