= Plasencia =

- Municipality
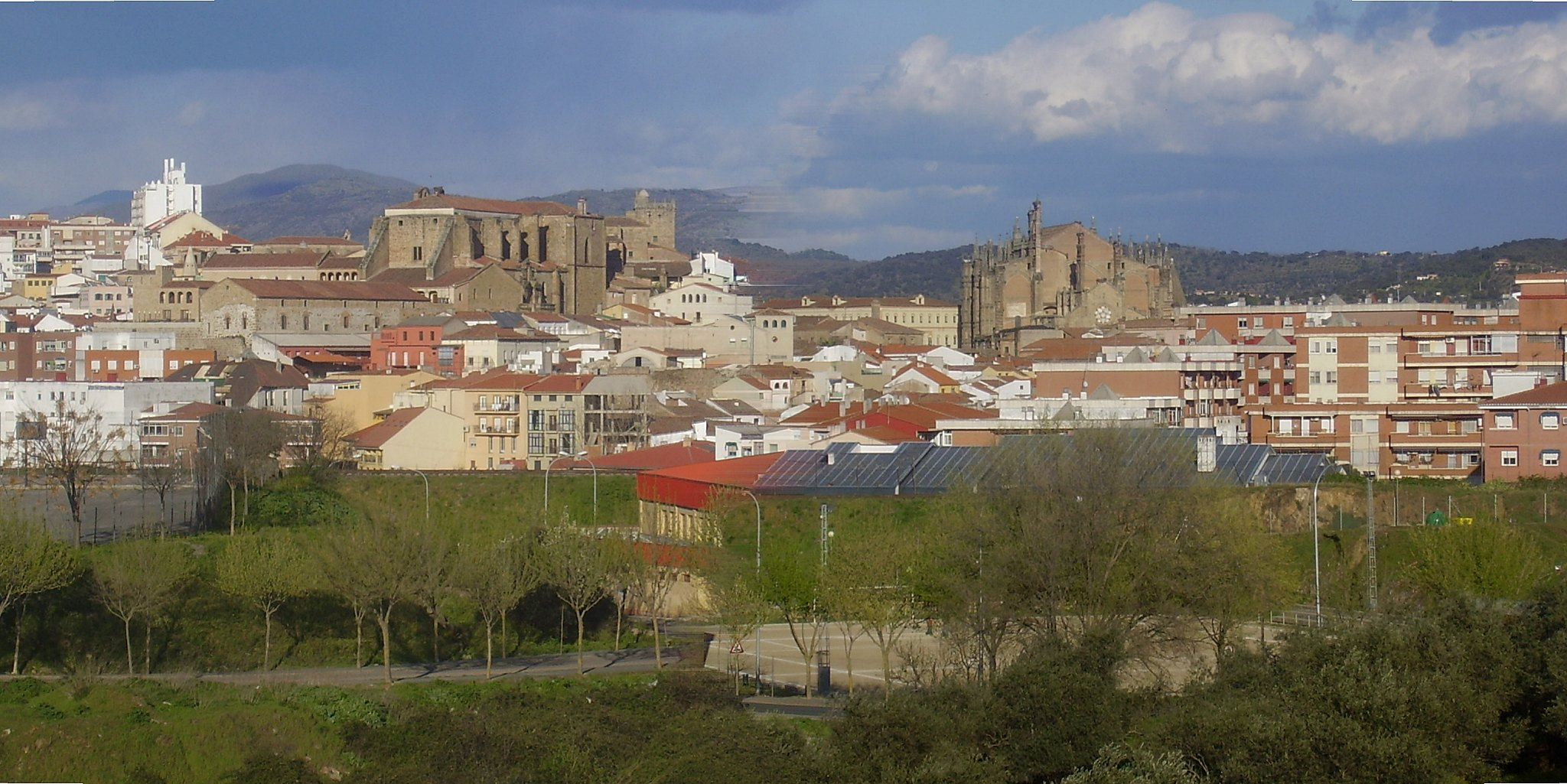
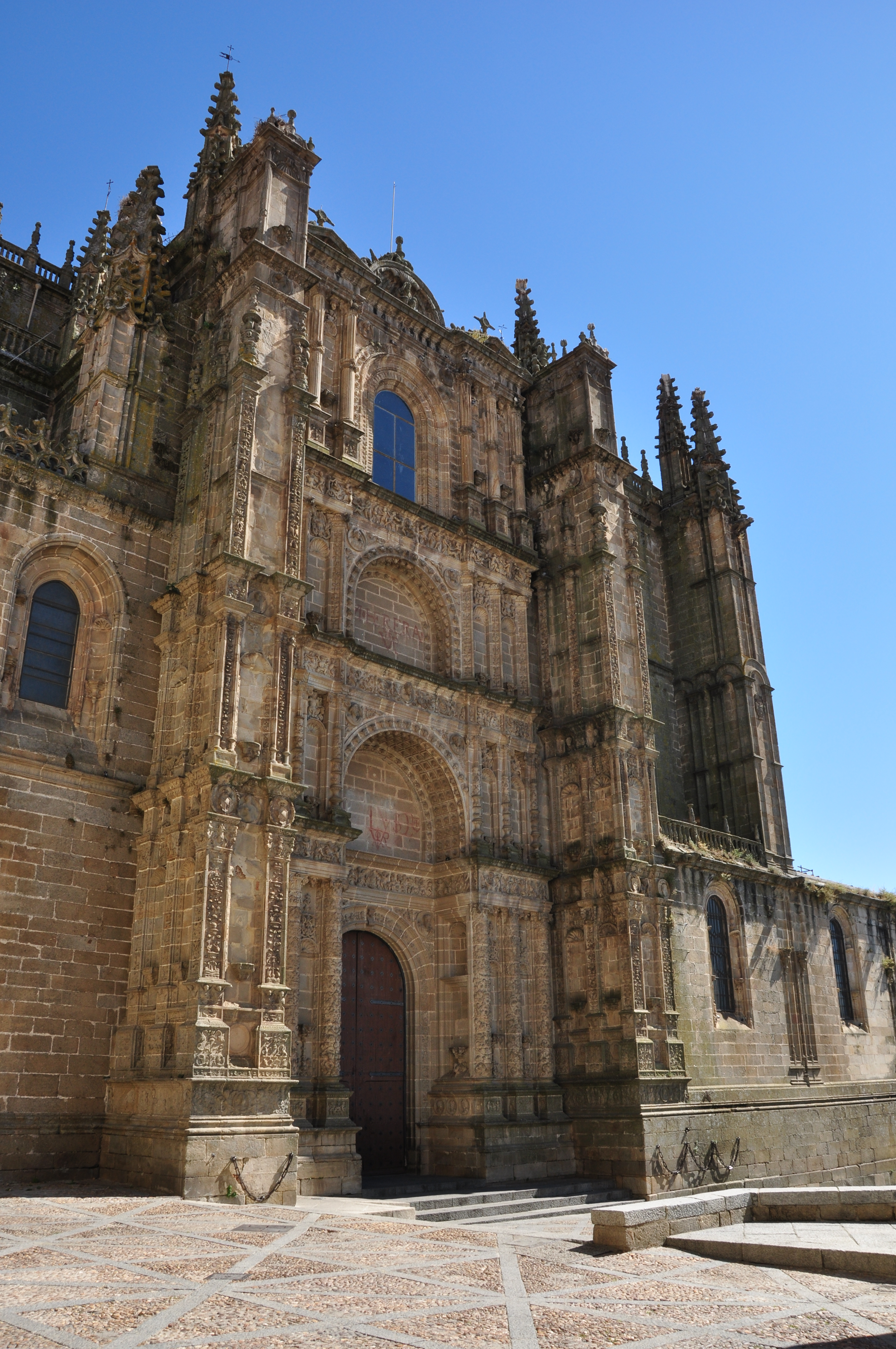
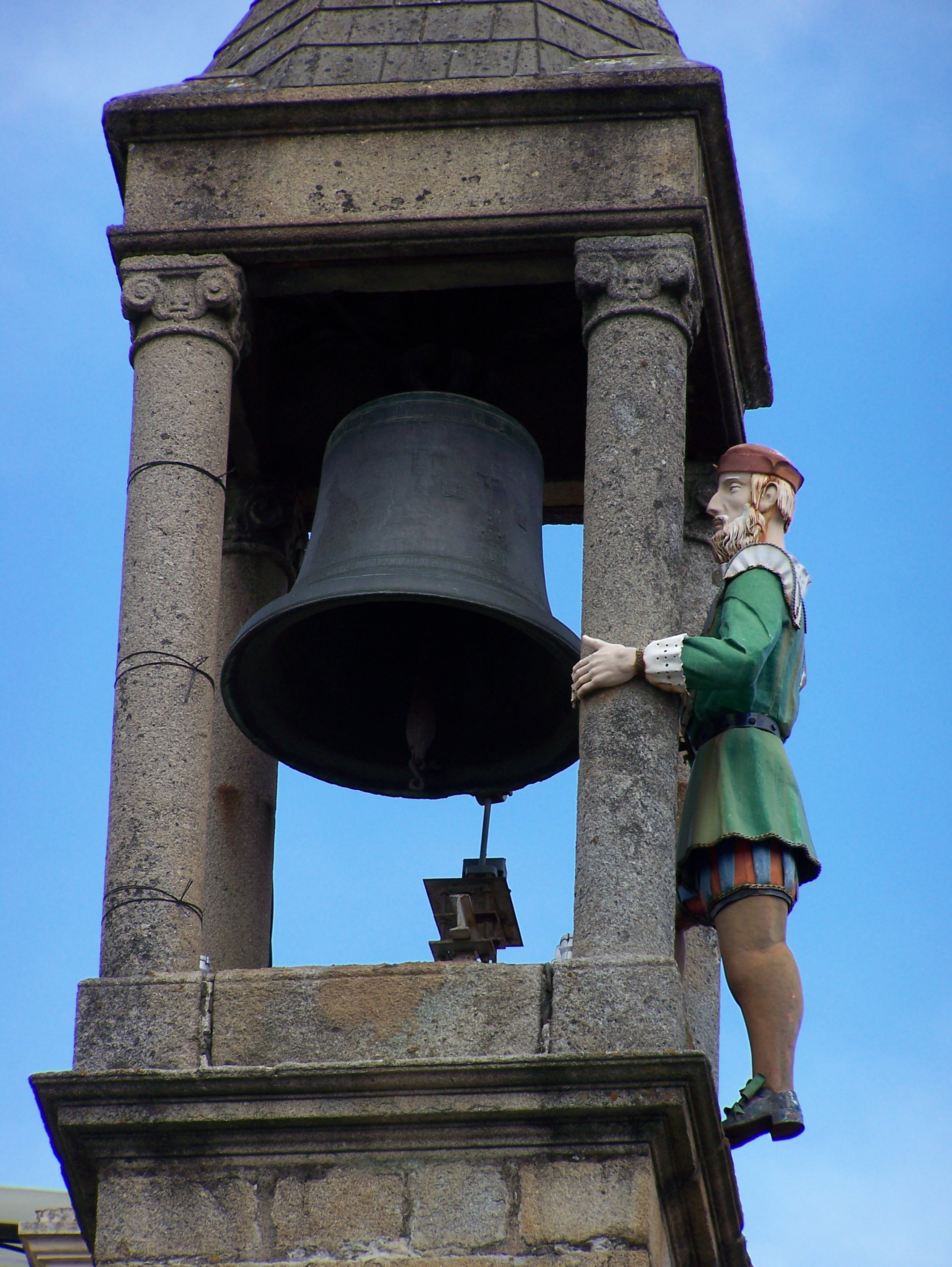
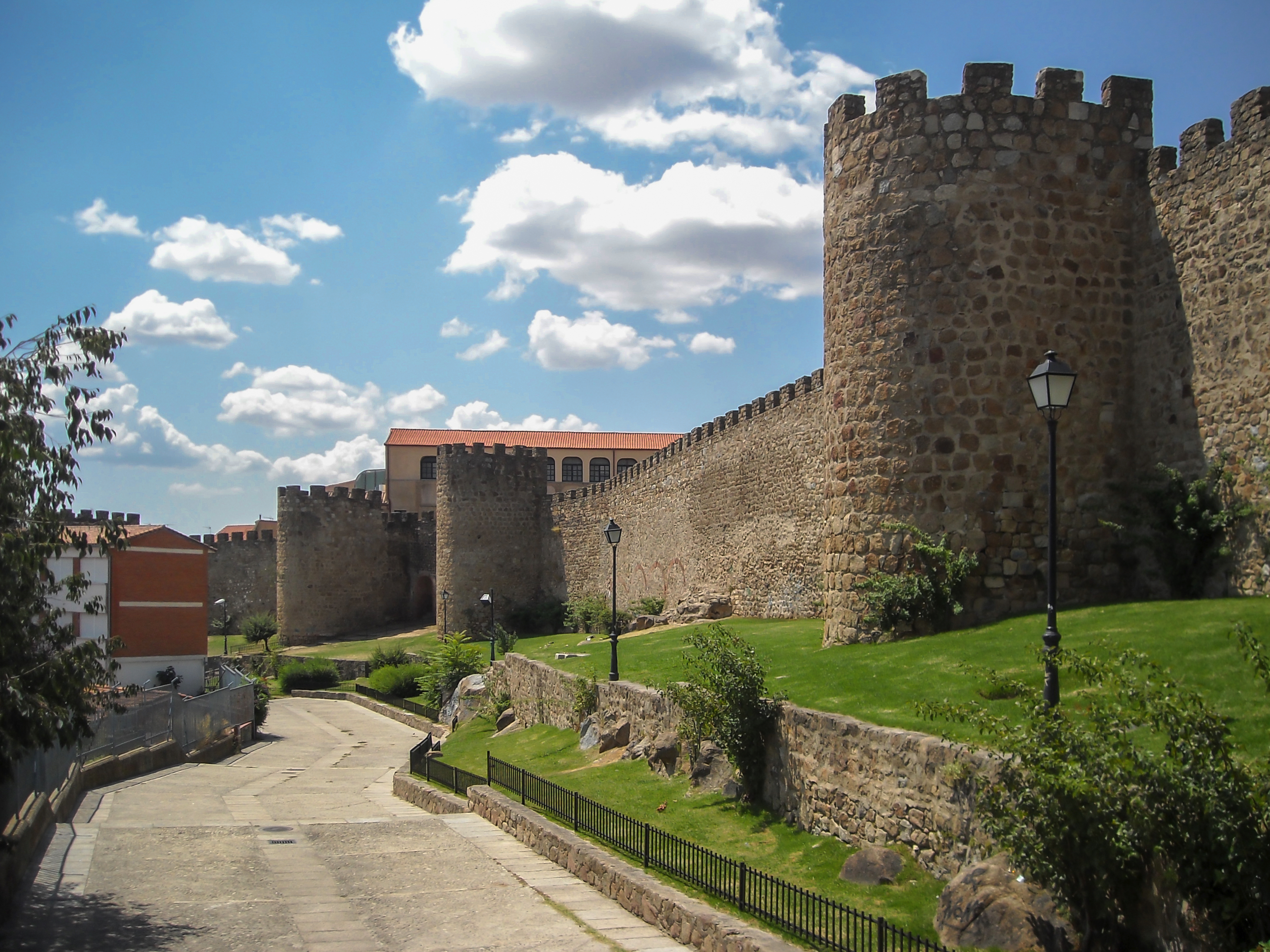
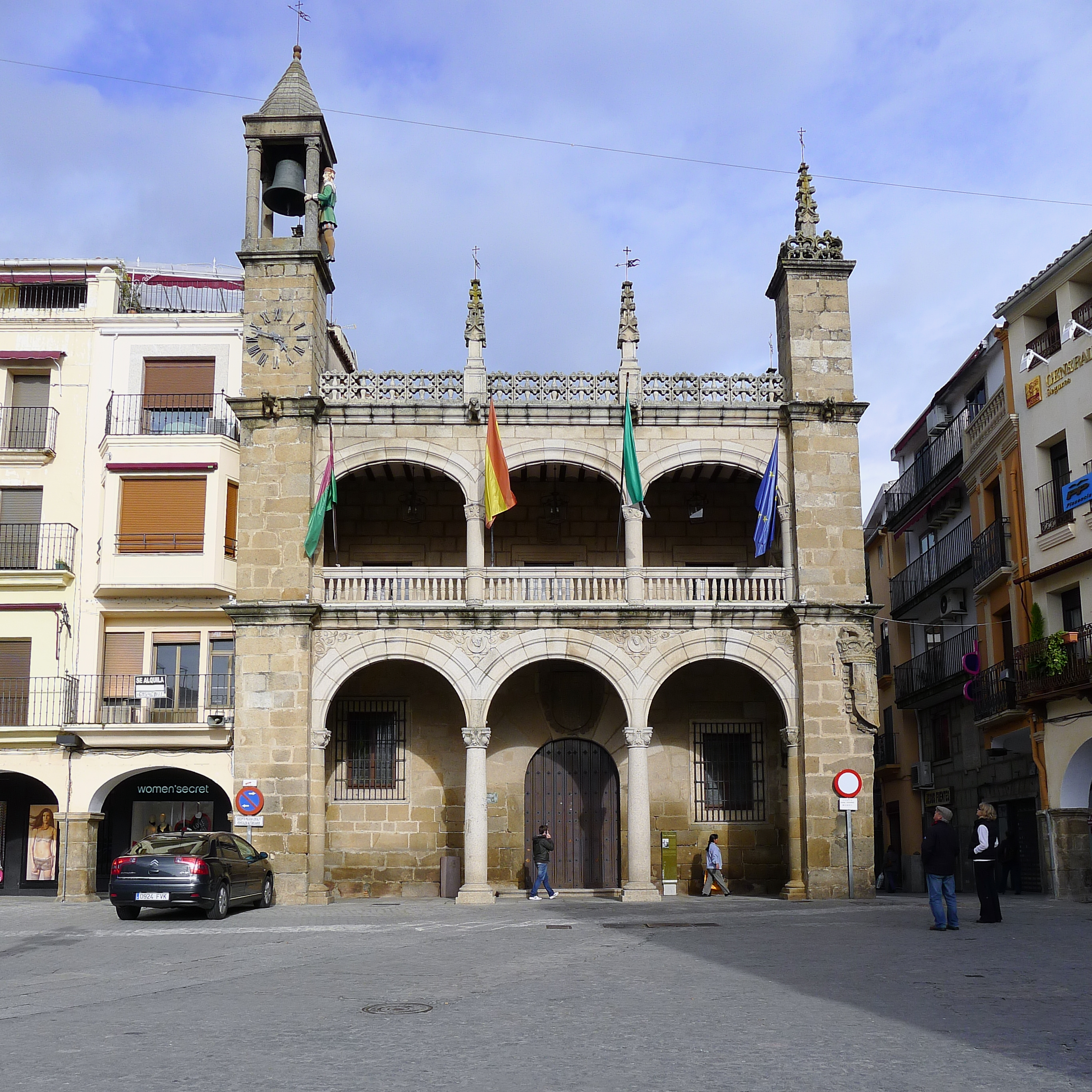
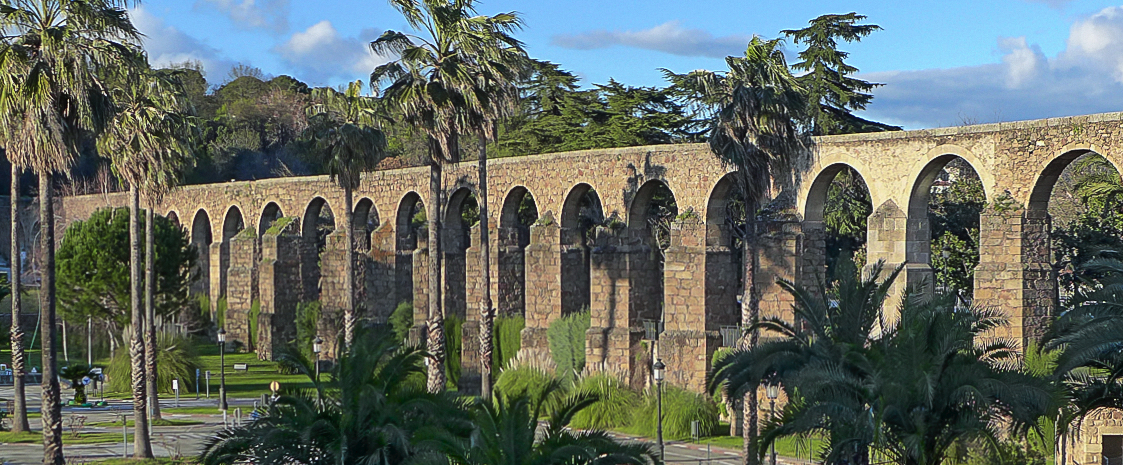
- Panoramic view of the city New Cathedral Abuelo Mayorga City walls Town Hall Medieval aqueduct From left to right, top to bottom: panoramic view, the New Cathedral of Plasencia, Abuelo Mayorga, the Jerte River, the city walls, the Town Hall, and the aqueduct.

- Flag Coat of arms
- Nickname: The Pearl of the Valley
- Motto: Ut placeat Deo et hominibus (Latin: to please God and men)
- Location within Spain Location within Extremadura
- Coordinates: 40°02′N 06°06′W
- Country: Spain
- Autonomous community: Extremadura
- Province: Cáceres
- Founded: 12 June 1186

Government
  - Type: Ayuntamiento
  - Body: Ayuntamiento de Plasencia
  - Mayor: Fernando Pizarro (PP)

Area
  - Total: 217.94 km^{2} (84.15 sq mi)
- Elevation: 406 m (1,332 ft)

Population (2025)
  - Total: 40,224
  - Density: 184.56/km^{2} (478.02/sq mi)
- Demonym(s): Placentino, -a(most common); Plasentino, -a Plasenciano, -a
- Time zone: UTC+1 (CET)
- Postal code: 10600
- Postal code: 10600, 10671 (Pradochano), 10690 (San Gil)
- Budget (2022): €37,144,179.14
- Website: www.plasencia.es

Plasencia (Spanish: [plaˈsenθja]) is a city and municipality in Spain, located in the northern part of the province of Cáceres in the autonomous community of Extremadura. The municipality does not form part of any municipal association with surrounding towns and geographically borders municipalities from six municipal associations: Valle del Jerte, La Vera, Monfragüe and its surroundings, Valle del Alagón, Ambroz Valley, and Trasierra - Tierras de Granadilla. Physically, the city is situated at the gateway to the Valle del Jerte, although administratively it does not belong to it, as the four major population centers in Extremadura (Badajoz, Cáceres, Mérida, and Plasencia) are not part of any comarca or municipal association.

The municipal territory of Plasencia covers an area of 217.94 km^{2} (84.15 sq mi) and includes the city of Plasencia as well as the minor local entities of San Gil and Pradochano. The municipality has a population of 40,224, making it the second most populous in the province of Cáceres and the fourth in Extremadura. The city is the episcopal see of its own diocese and the capital of the judicial district no. 4 of the province. As the most populous city in northern Extremadura, it is home to various services of the General State Administration and the Government of Extremadura, serving both its residents and those of numerous neighboring municipalities.

It was founded as a city by King Alfonso VIII of Castile in 1186. Its establishment was driven by military strategy considerations during the Reconquista, as the city was located just a few kilometers from the Castilian borders with the Kingdom of León to the west and the Muslim territories to the south. The border with León was marked in this area by the Vía de la Plata, an important Roman road now used as a hiking route. Until the 19th century, it was the capital of the Sexmo of Plasencia, a community of villages that covered a quarter of the current province of Cáceres. Despite not exceeding twenty thousand inhabitants until the 1960 census, significant events occurred in the city, such as the marriage of Joanna la Beltraneja during the Castilian War of Succession and the initiative to purchase a vote in the Cortes of Castile, which led to the creation of the Province of Extremadura in 1653.

The municipality's economy is primarily based on the service sector, with over a thousand commercial establishments in the city. At the beginning of the 20th century, the municipality had its own savings bank, which later became the foundation of Caja de Extremadura (subsequently Liberbank and currently Unicaja). Tourism is significant, as its historic center is declared a cultural heritage site and the city has two festivals declared of tourist interest: Martes Mayor and Holy Week. The city has a university center affiliated with the University of Extremadura, offering four undergraduate degrees and one master's degree.

== Etymology ==
The city's toponym derives from the motto given by its founder, King Alfonso VIII of Castile, in the coat of arms granted to the city: "Ut placeat Deo et Hominibus", a Latin phrase meaning "To please God and men". However, before Alfonso VIII's arrival, there was an inhabited place in the area whose exact name is unknown, possibly called Ambroz, Ambrosía, Ambracia, or Pagus Ambracensis.

Demonym

The most commonly used demonym for the inhabitants of Plasencia is "placentino". According to the Dictionary of the Spanish Language, this word derives from the Latin Placentīnus and can be used as a demonym for both the Extremaduran municipality and the Italian city of Piacenza. The Royal Spanish Academy also recognizes the terms "plasentino" and "plasenciano" as valid demonyms for the Extremaduran town.

Homonymous localities

There are other localities in the world that share the same name as the city on the Jerte River. In Spain, there are the municipality of Plasencia de Jalón in the province of Zaragoza and the hamlet of Plasencia del Monte in the province of Huesca. In Spanish, the Italian city of Piacenza, with which the Extremaduran city is twinned, is often referred to as Plasencia.

Another very similar name is Placencia, a municipality in Belize named by Spanish explorers and which shares its name with the Guipuzcoan municipality of Placencia de las Armas. Placencia and Plasencia can be homophones in some Spanish dialects due to seseo and ceceo.

In Canada, there is a municipality called Placentia, in the province of Newfoundland and Labrador, whose name derives directly from the city on the Jerte River. In California, there is also another Placentia. In Italy, there is also a municipality called Piacenza, the homonymous capital belonging to the Emilia-Romagna region, also referred to as Plasencia in Spanish.

== Symbols ==
Coat of arms of Plasencia

The heraldic shield of Plasencia is one of the oldest in the province, as Alfonso VIII of Castile inscribed the motto Ut placeat Deo et hominibus on it at the end of the 12th century. The coat of arms, without the motto, is heraldically described as follows:

On a silver field, a golden tower, topped with a keep, crenelated, masoned in sable, and with red openings, accompanied on the dexter side by an uprooted pine tree, in vert, and on the sinister side by an uprooted chestnut tree, also in vert; all on a vert terrace. At the top, an open Royal Crown.

Flag of Plasencia

The flag, which features the coat of arms in its center, is described as follows:

The rectangular flag has a 2:3 proportion and is made up of two equal horizontal stripes: purple on top and green on the bottom. The municipal coat of arms is in the center of the flag and is depicted in its original colors.

Several towns in the former Sexmo of Plasencia have incorporated Plasencia's coat of arms into theirs, including Navaconcejo.

== History ==
=== Ancient and Medieval Ages ===
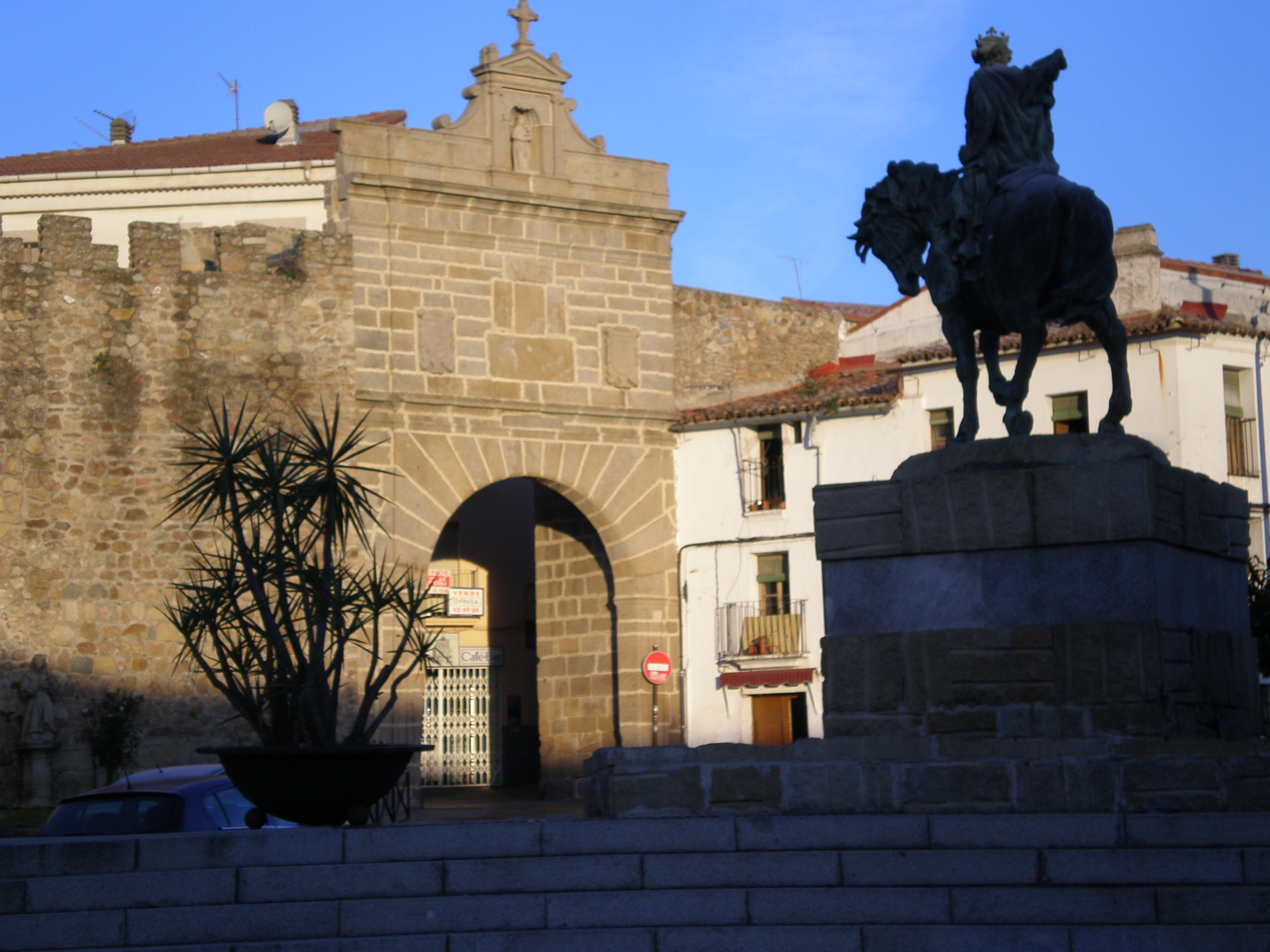
Statue of Alfonso VIII of Castile and Sun Gate

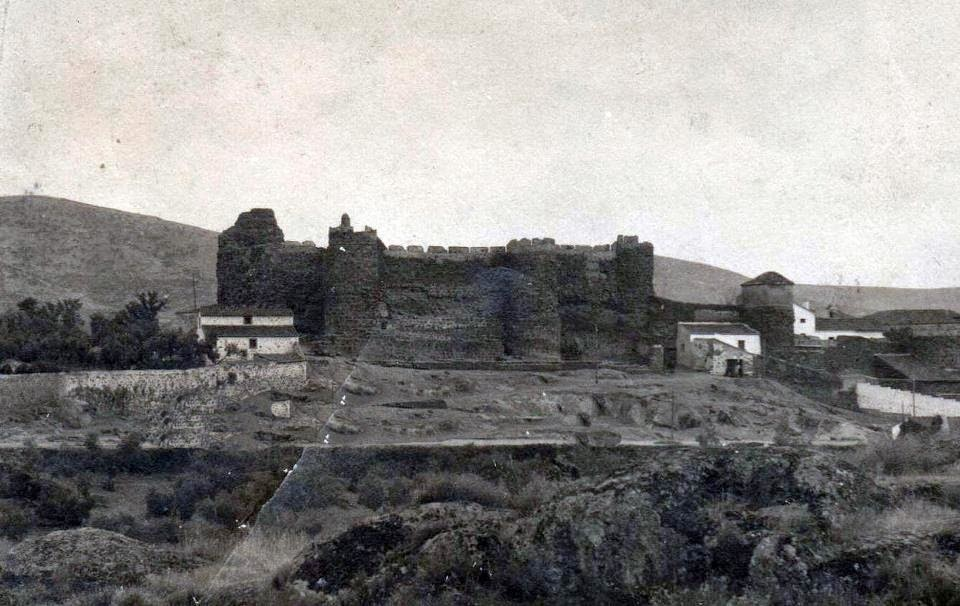
Alcázar of Plasencia before its demolition in 1941

Although the current city of Plasencia was not founded until 1186, there is evidence that the territory was inhabited in Prehistory, as ceramic remains have been found in the Boquique Cave. Additionally, the dictionary of Pascual Madoz notes that a lost settlement called Ambroz or Ambracia may have been located in present-day Plasencia, though it is possible that this settlement was in Aldeanueva del Camino, while a settlement called Pagus Ambracensis existed in Plasencia. In any case, there are known constructions of Arab origin predating the city's foundation. Among these was a tower from the 8th century near the Trujillo Bridge, called the Torre del Ambroz, next to which a small Arab hamlet was built.

In a document issued in Burgos in 1181 under the reign of Alfonso VIII of Castile, it was established—in contradiction with the Treaty of Medina and the Plata border between the kingdoms of León and Castile—that much of the territory in the north of the current province of Cáceres and the northwest of the province of Toledo belonged to the jurisdiction of the Ávila council. This situation changed in 1186 with the establishment of the city of Plasencia, founded that same year by Alfonso VIII; the monarch set the territorial boundaries of the new council in 1189. The motto of the newly founded city was Ut placeat Deo et Hominibus, meaning "to please God and men" in Latin. In 1189, Pope Clement III created the Diocese of Plasencia with its seat in the city. The city's early years were challenging due to its location in a border area near territories controlled by Muslims. In 1196, it was taken by the Almohads, following the Castilian defeat in the Battle of Alarcos (1195), but Alfonso VIII and the Kingdom of Castile recovered it that same year on August 15. Following this reconquest, the decision was made to build the city's walls.

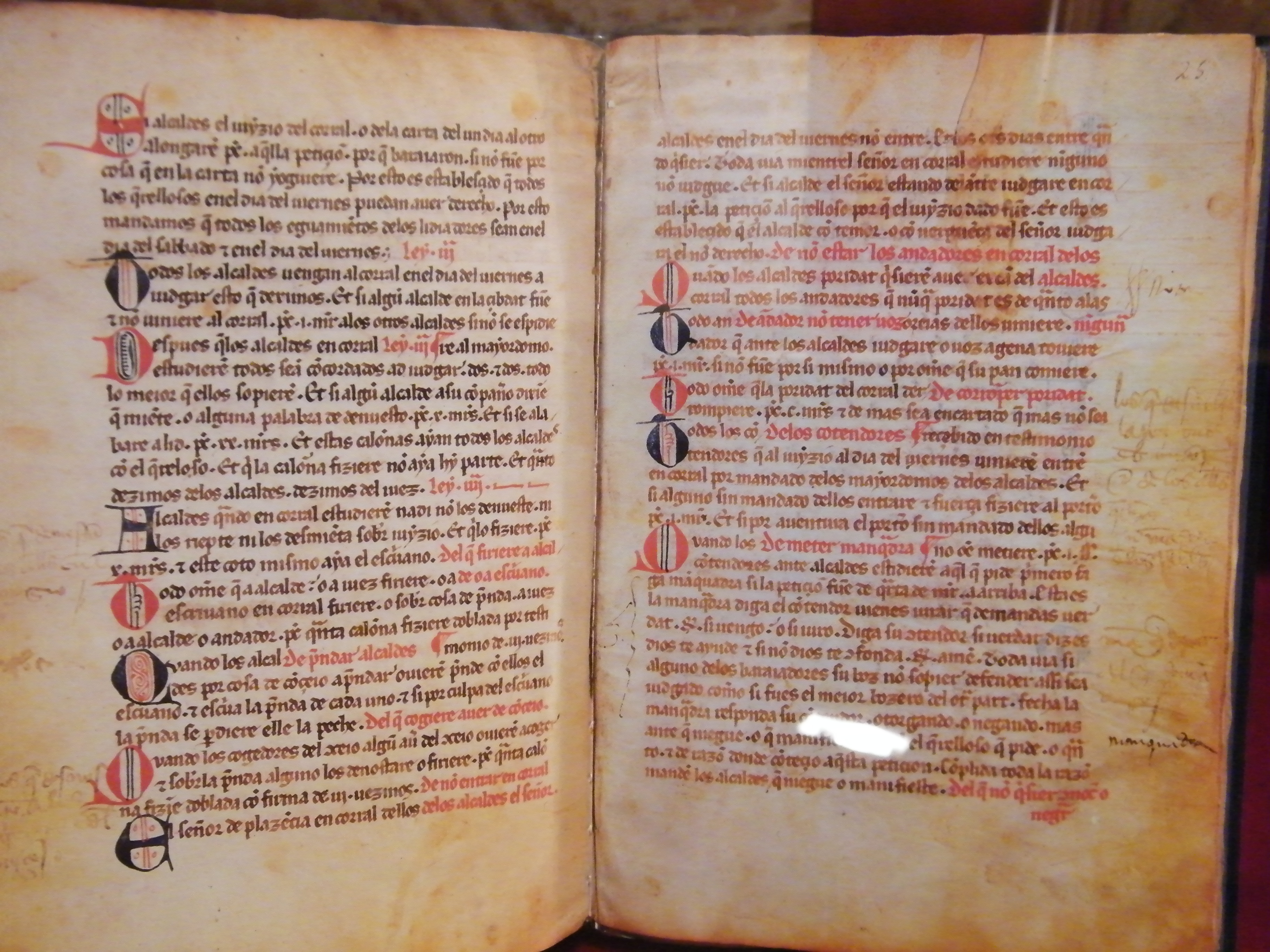
Fuero of Plasencia

At the end of the 13th century, the king granted the Fuero of Plasencia, which placed great importance on coexistence among Christians, Muslims, and Jews. This fostered the formation of a significant Jewish community, the largest in Extremadura, with considerable economic influence.

One of the earliest written references to a bullfight is found in the Cantigas de Santa María by Alfonso X the Wise, in the so-called "Toro de Plasencia" cantiga, which recounts an event at a bullfight held in the city's square, where, thanks to the miraculous intervention of the Virgin, a man was saved from being killed by one of the bulls being fought.

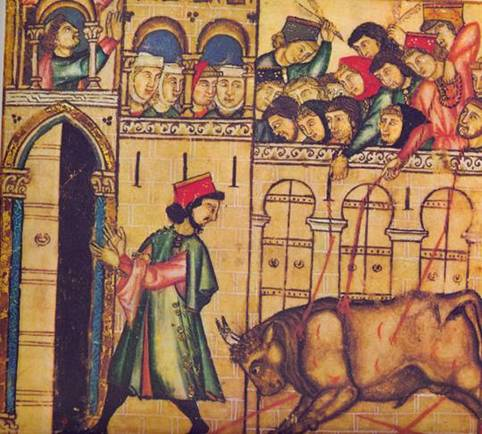
Cantiga 144, The Bull of Plasencia

The city then had the right to vote in the Cortes of Castile, evidenced by the sending of two representatives to the courts held in Madrid in 1391. The 15th century was a pivotal period in the city's history, during which feudal practices of the Middle Ages led to the end of its royal status and the establishment of a lordship jurisdiction. In 1442, King John II of Castile granted the city to the Estúñiga or Zúñiga family, conferring the title of Count of Plasencia to Pedro de Zúñiga. Upon becoming a lordship, Plasencia lost its voting rights in the Cortes. At the request of its bishop, Cardinal Juan de Carvajal, humanities studies were established in the city in 1446. These were the first university-level general studies in what is now Extremadura.

In the second half of the 15th century, Plasencia played a role in the Castilian succession conflict. King Henry IV of Castile was deposed in the city on April 27, 1465, as sovereign of Castile. Later, the Count of Plasencia took an active part in the Farce of Ávila, seizing the sword, a symbol of justice, from the wooden statue representing the Castilian king and proclaiming Infante Alfonso as king. Subsequently, King Henry IV's daughter, Joanna la Beltraneja, married Alfonso V of Portugal on May 29, 1475, in the House of the Rings in Plasencia, where they were proclaimed kings of Castile and Portugal.

In June 1488, the duke died and was succeeded by his grandson Álvaro de Zúñiga y Pérez de Guzmán. The Plasencian nobility seized the opportunity to rise in arms against the Zúñiga family to regain the power they previously held over the city and the rents from the lands dependent on it. The rebels were supported by the Catholic Monarchs, who revoked the donation made by John II, arguing it was excessive and against their will. The revolt succeeded, and the royal status was restored, ratified on October 20, 1488, at the cathedral's gates in the presence of Ferdinand the Catholic, who swore to always defend the city's charters and freedom.

=== Modern age ===
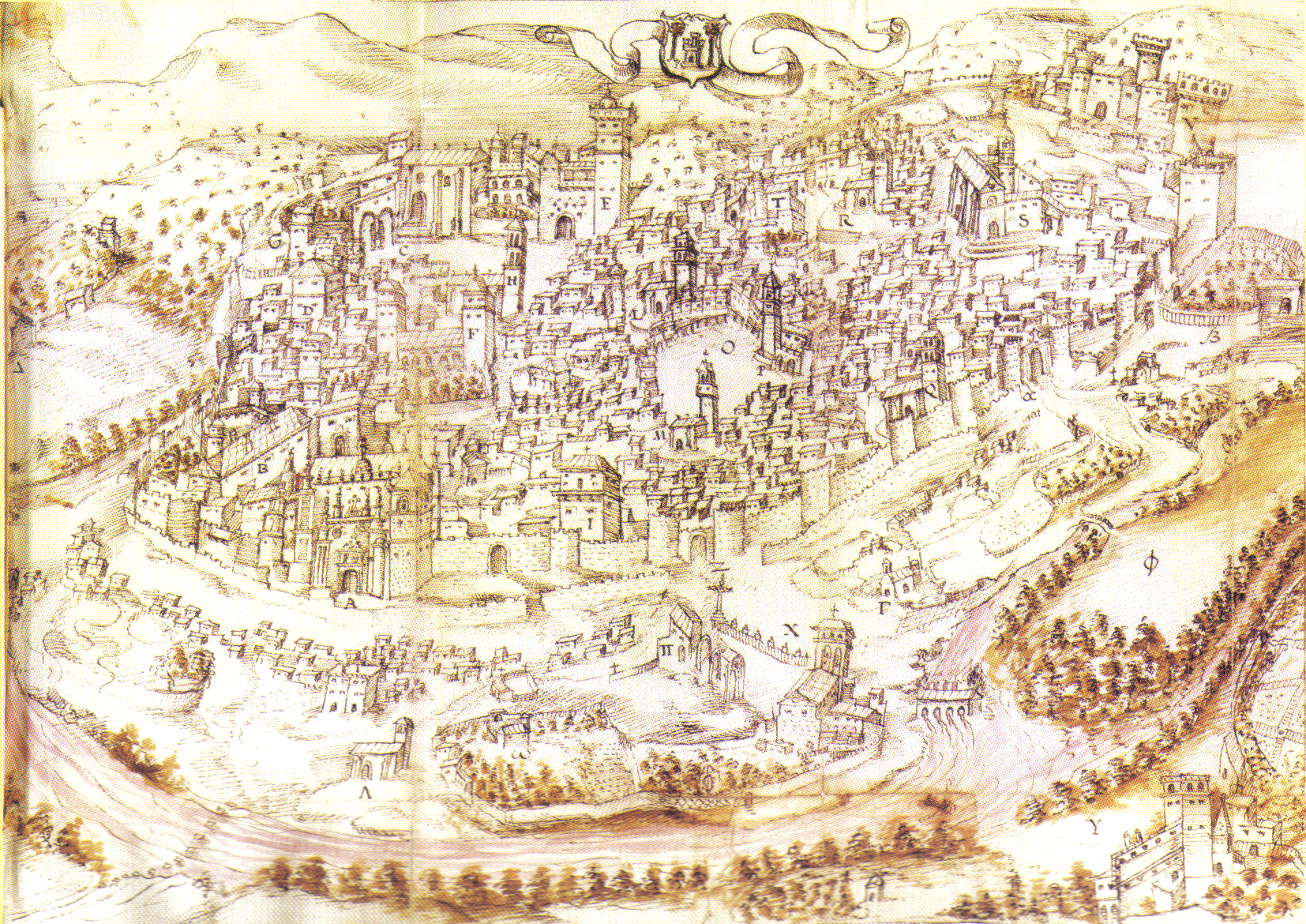
Plasencia in the 16th century

During this period, Plasencia was recommended by court physicians to Ferdinand the Catholic as the healthiest place in all his kingdoms and where he should establish his residence. The monarch moved to live in Plasencia in 1515. He died in Madrigalejo in January 1516 while traveling from Plasencia to Guadalupe to attend the chapter of the Order of Calatrava and Order of Alcántara at the Guadalupe Monastery.

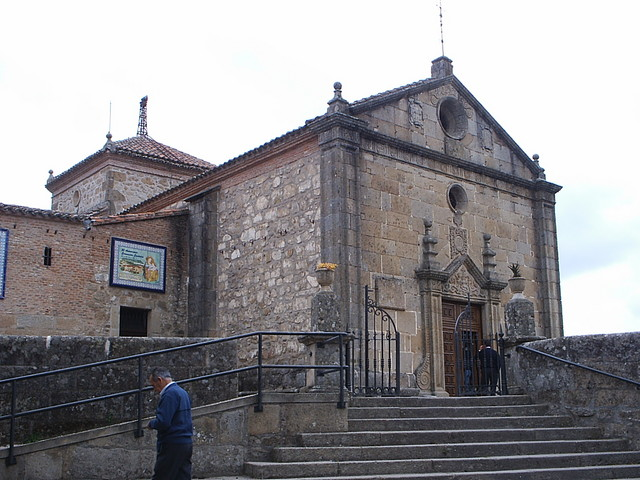
Virgin of the Port Sanctuary, built in the Modern Age

Between 1520 and 1522, during the Revolt of the Comuneros, Plasencia sided with the comuneros, managing to establish a community in Plasencia, but it was weakened by the proximity of royalist strongholds such as Ciudad Rodrigo and Cáceres.

Between 1528 and 1531, the composer Cristóbal de Morales resided in Plasencia, where he served as choirmaster.

Plasencia also had some significance during the Spanish conquest of the Americas. In 1539, an expedition funded by Bishop Gutierre de Vargas Carvajal went to the Strait of Magellan. One of the expedition's ships, led by Alonso de Camargo, managed to cross the strait.

In 1573, the Plasencian bishop Pedro Ponce de León donated part of his library to the El Escorial Monastery, including the Glosas Emilianenses from the Monasteries of San Millán de la Cogolla. In 1665, another bishop, Diego de Arce y Reinoso, had a library of 3,880 works in 10,000 volumes at the time of his death.

The province of Salamanca in 1590 according to votes in the Cortes of Castile

When the first 18 provinces of Castile were established in 1502, they were defined based on the cities with voting rights in the Cortes. No city in present-day Extremadura had such a vote, so most of the region belonged to the Province of Salamanca. For this reason, in 1653, Plasencia decided to purchase the vote in the Cortes it had previously held, a purchase made jointly with Alcántara, Badajoz, Cáceres, Mérida, and Trujillo. This marked the creation of the former Province of Extremadura, which comprised the Trujillo district and the León territory of the Order of Santiago (divided into two districts, Mérida and Llerena, each with several encomiendas), to which the lands of Coria and Granadilla were added.

=== Contemporary age ===
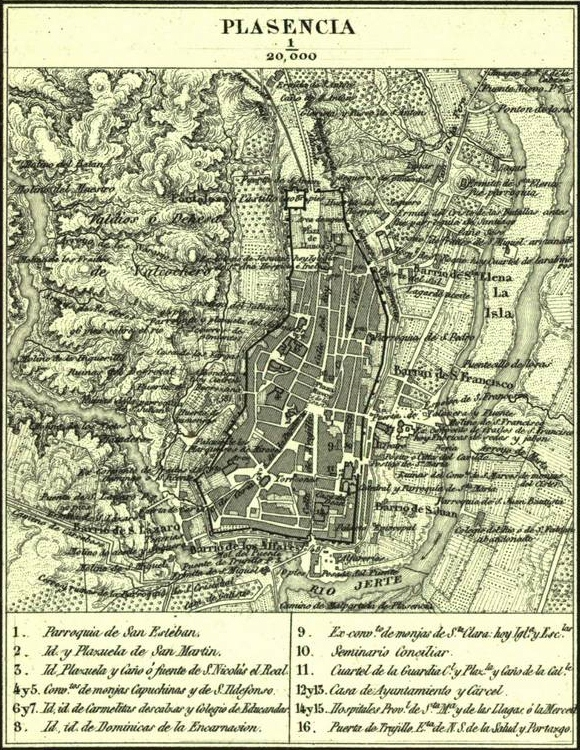
Map of the city from the mid-19th century, by Francisco Coello

During the Spanish War of Independence (1808–1814), Plasencia became a strategic location for French troops. On June 8 and 13, 1808, riots led to the killing of several pro-French individuals, some by lynching. Shortly afterward, the Plasencians formed a local armament and defense council and sought support on the right bank of the Tagus. Despite the council's efforts, the city was taken by French troops on December 28, 1808, after burning Malpartida de Plasencia two days earlier. The French occupied the city twelve times during the conflict, extorting its inhabitants and causing significant damage to the city.

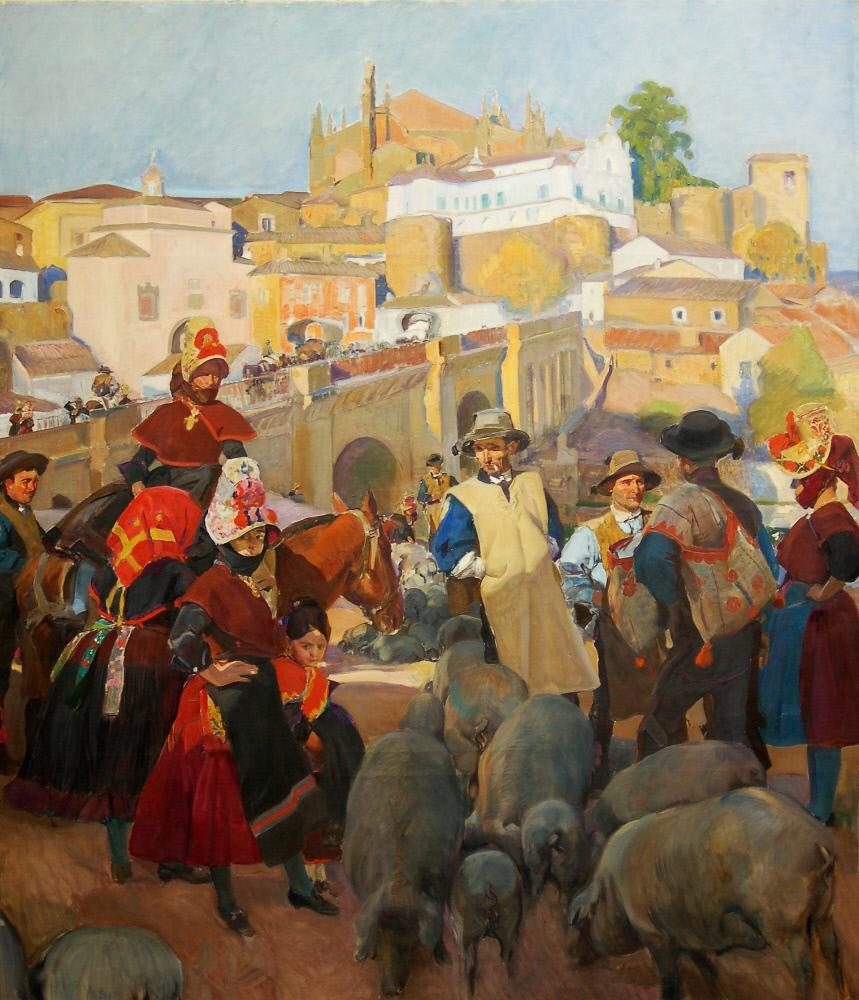
The Market, oil painting by Joaquín Sorolla depicting the city in 1917

Upon the fall of the Old Regime, the city became a constitutional municipality in the region of Extremadura. When Extremadura was divided into the current province of Cáceres and province of Badajoz in 1822, Plasencia competed with Cáceres for the capital of the former, arguing that it had a larger population on the right bank of the Tagus River and was an episcopal see. Other criteria prevailed, and Cáceres was chosen as the provincial capital. Since 1834, it has been the head of the judicial district of Plasencia. During the First Spanish Republic, the Canton of Plasencia was established in the city during the Cantonal Rebellion, to reclaim its previously rejected status as the provincial capital.

The Restoration was an important period for Plasencia, as significant reforms impacted the municipality's economy and society. For the first time, the city had a drinking water network and public lighting, and the sewage system was improved. The city's economy, previously based almost exclusively on agriculture and trade, industrialized following the creation of the city's railway station, around which an industrial district was built.

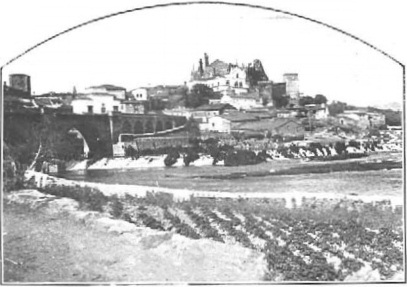
General view of Plasencia, published in 1908, by Venancio Gombau (1862–1929)

In 1917, the Valencian painter Joaquín Sorolla immortalized the city in one of his paintings, The Market, depicting the view from one of the banks of the Jerte River, with the episcopal palace, the cathedral, the Trujillo Bridge, and women dressed in the Montehermoso traditional costume. The work is part of a series of fourteen large canvases titled Vision of Spain, commissioned by the American magnate Archer Milton Huntington to decorate the library of the Hispanic Society, in New York, an institution he founded.

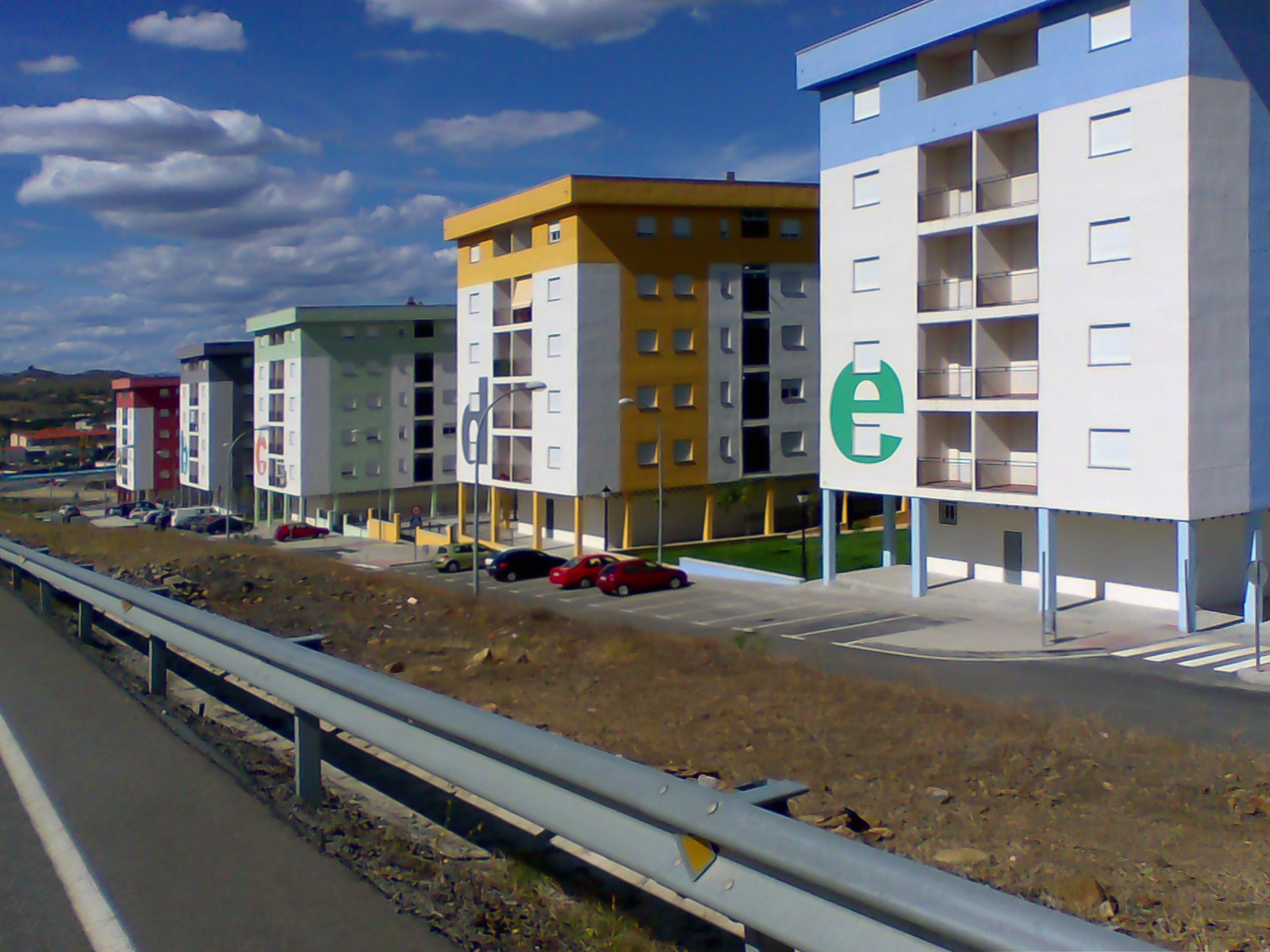
Los Monjes, a peripheral neighborhood built in the early 21st century during the peak of the property bubble

During the Spanish Civil War, Plasencia was not a contested area, as the coup of 1936 succeeded immediately in the city. On July 19, Lieutenant Colonel José Puente, head of the Plasencia Machine Gun Battalion, took control of the city with little resistance. Republican prisoners were later used in penal labor to build the Los Pinos Park.

The second half of the 20th century was a period of remarkable development for Plasencia. Demographically, while the province of Cáceres lost a quarter of its population between 1950 and 2001, Plasencia doubled its legal population during the same period, growing from 17,507 inhabitants to 36,690. Over those fifty years, numerous public works were constructed, including the Virgen del Puerto Hospital, the Plasencia Reservoir, the municipal sports city, and the former road to Navalmoral. Additionally, university schools of nursing and business studies were established, which by the end of the century merged into the current Plasencia Campus.

== Geography ==
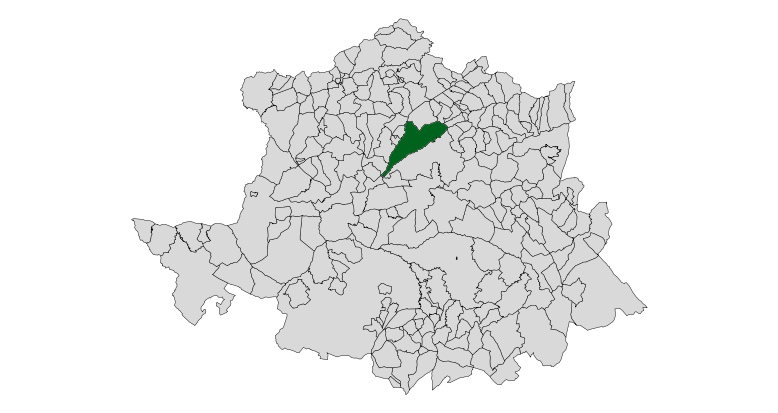
In green, the municipal territory of Plasencia. In gray, the rest of the municipalities of the province of Cáceres

The city is located 80 kilometers from the provincial capital. The municipality's terrain is varied, featuring the last elevations of the Sierra de Gredos, which contrast with the Valle del Jerte and the first typical Extremaduran dehesas. The Sierra del Gordo, to the north, is part of the Montes de Traslasierra, with its highest point being Pico Gordo (998 meters). To the northeast is the Sierra de San Bernabé, a branch of the Sierra de Tormantos, reaching up to 790 meters in this area. To the southwest is the Sierra de Berenguel, where Pico Merengue (655 meters) stands out. The Jerte River, in its lower course, is the most significant river, just before it flows into the Alagón River. Its waters are dammed at the Plasencia Reservoir. The altitude ranges from 998 meters (Pico Gordo) to 260 meters along the banks of the Jerte River. The urban area stands at 352 meters above sea level.

The municipal territory of Plasencia borders the following municipalities:

=== Hydrography ===
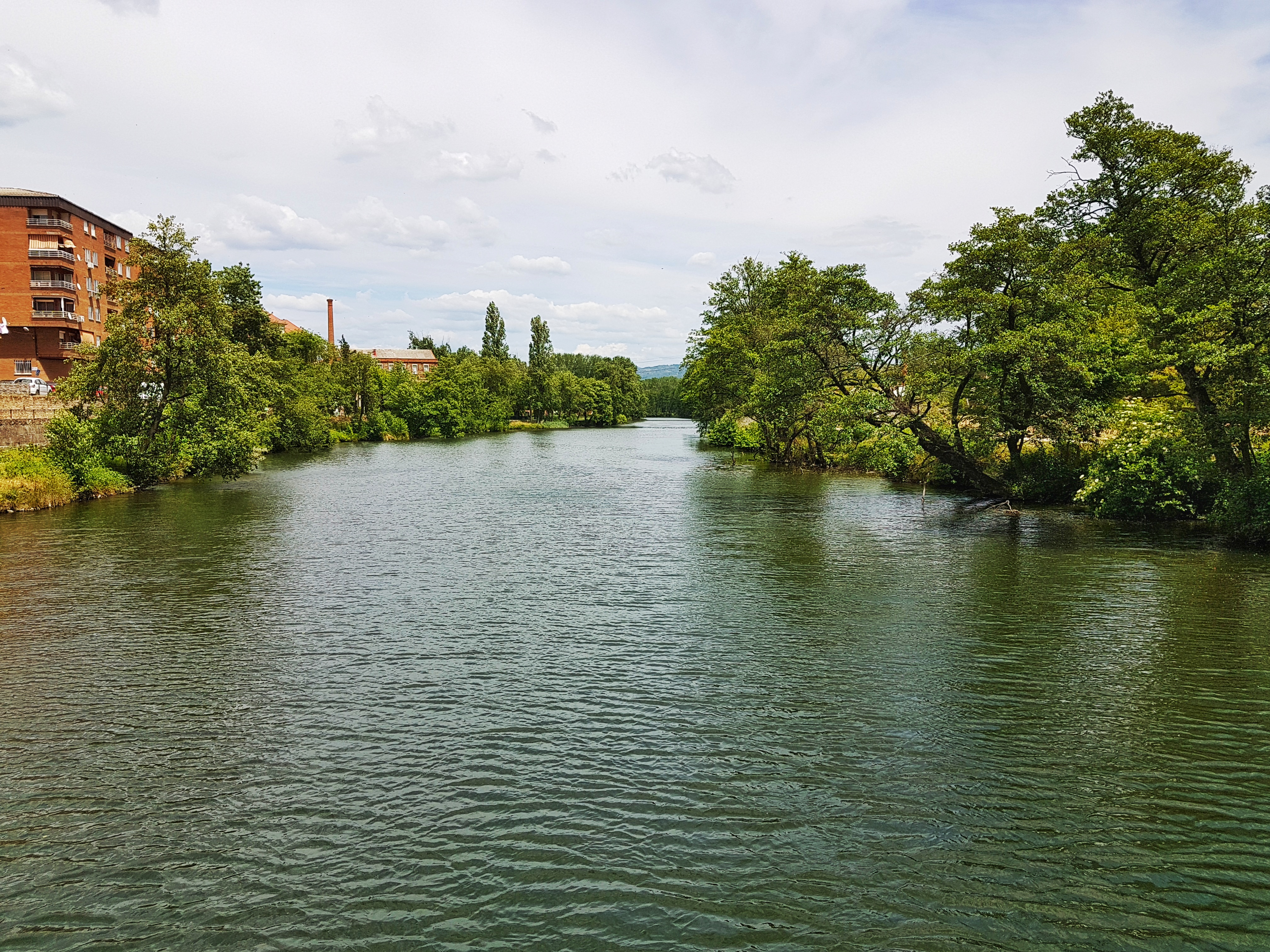
The Jerte River flowing through Plasencia

Almost the entire municipal territory lies within the hydrographic basins of the Jerte River and Alagón River, with the former being a tributary of the latter, which in turn is a tributary of the Tagus River. The confluence of the Jerte River into the Alagón River is located downstream of Plasencia, in the municipality of Galisteo. Four kilometers upstream from the city is the Plasencia Reservoir, built in 1985 with a capacity of 59 hm³, which regulates the discharge passing through the city, preventing floods. The reservoir's purpose is to supply drinking water to the population. There are no significant aquifers in the municipality.

=== Climate ===
According to the Papadakis climate classification system, most of the municipal territory of Plasencia falls within the continental Mediterranean climate. In the sierras surrounding Plasencia, the climate corresponds to temperate Mediterranean and cool Mediterranean classifications. Summers are very warm during sunlight hours and cool at night, while winters are cold. In the coldest months, temperatures drop below 0 °C, and in the hottest months, temperatures rarely exceed 40 °C. Consequently, the city experiences less extreme heat compared to other cities in the region.

According to the Köppen-Geiger climate classification, Plasencia has a subtropical climate with dry, hot summers, classified as Csa (Mediterranean climate).

The climate in this area, despite its relative proximity to the microclimate of the Valle del Jerte and the nearby Sierra de Gredos, is similar to that found in the Extremaduran dehesa, given the similar altitude above sea level. However, due to the longitudinal orography of the Sierra de Gredos, precipitation is higher than in the rest of the central plateau, though in absolute terms, it is more similar to the southern plateau than to mountainous regions such as the Ambroz Valley or Jerte Valley. Significant differences in precipitation can occur within the same weather event between the city and municipalities just 20 kilometers to the north. Rainfall ranges between 800 and 1000 mm annually, scarce during the summer but slightly higher than in the Extremaduran capitals.

Average climatic parameters of the Plasencia thermopluviometric station (1961-1996)
Month	Jan	Feb	Mar	Apr	May	Jun	Jul	Aug	Sep	Oct	Nov	Dec	Annual
Average monthly maximum temperature (°C)	17	20	23	27	31	36	39	39	35	29	23	18	28.08
Average monthly temperature (°C)	6.5	8	9.5	13	16.5	21	24	24	21	16	10.5	7	14.75
Average monthly minimum temperature (°C)	-4	-4	-4	-1	2	6	9	9	7	3	-2	-4	1.42
Precipitation (mm)	107	73	63	70	46	12	2	5	31	111	107	133	760

Climate data for Plasencia Thermopluviometric Station (3519X) (415 m above sea level) (Reference period: 2000–2021)
Month	Jan	Feb	Mar	Apr	May	Jun	Jul	Aug	Sep	Oct	Nov	Dec	Year
Record high °C (°F)	20.8 (69.4)	24.1 (75.4)	28.1 (82.6)	30.3 (86.5)	37.1 (98.8)	42.0 (107.6)	41.6 (106.9)	43.5 (110.3)	42.9 (109.2)	34.6 (94.3)	24.8 (76.6)	19.2 (66.6)	43.5 (110.3)
Mean daily maximum °C (°F)	12.1 (53.8)	14.2 (57.6)	17.3 (63.1)	19.9 (67.8)	24.8 (76.6)	30.6 (87.1)	34.0 (93.2)	34.1 (93.4)	29.4 (84.9)	22.8 (73.0)	15.6 (60.1)	12.5 (54.5)	22.3 (72.1)
Daily mean °C (°F)	8.1 (46.6)	9.6 (49.3)	12.2 (54.0)	14.6 (58.3)	18.7 (65.7)	23.8 (74.8)	26.8 (80.2)	27.0 (80.6)	23.2 (73.8)	17.8 (64.0)	11.5 (52.7)	8.8 (47.8)	16.8 (62.2)
Mean daily minimum °C (°F)	4.1 (39.4)	5.1 (41.2)	7.1 (44.8)	9.2 (48.6)	12.7 (54.9)	16.9 (62.4)	19.6 (67.3)	19.9 (67.8)	17.0 (62.6)	12.8 (55.0)	7.5 (45.5)	5.0 (41.0)	11.4 (52.5)
Record low °C (°F)	−3.5 (25.7)	−2.7 (27.1)	−3.7 (25.3)	1.1 (34.0)	3.3 (37.9)	8.5 (47.3)	10.6 (51.1)	11.9 (53.4)	9.0 (48.2)	3.5 (38.3)	−2.1 (28.2)	−4.5 (23.9)	−4.5 (23.9)
Average precipitation mm (inches)	69.5 (2.74)	75.4 (2.97)	73.7 (2.90)	72.1 (2.84)	36.6 (1.44)	14.9 (0.59)	7.0 (0.28)	4.7 (0.19)	41.3 (1.63)	82.3 (3.24)	80.8 (3.18)	68.0 (2.68)	626.4 (24.66)
Average precipitation days (≥ >=0.1 mm)	11	12	12	14	8	3	2	2	6	19	13	11	113
Average relative humidity (%)	72	64	60	60	55	48	44	43	48	60	69	71	57.9
Source: State Meteorological Agency (AEMET)

=== Nature ===
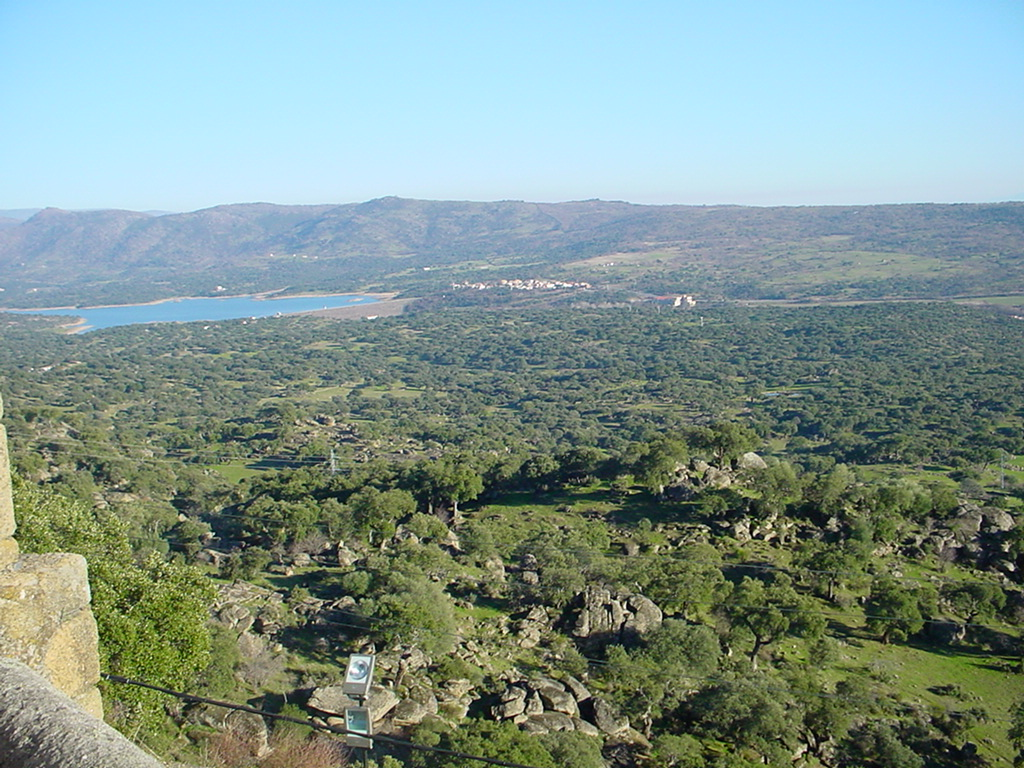
Valcorchero landscape from the Puerto Sanctuary

Flora

The original vegetation in the region has been altered by human intervention. The most forested flora was replaced by agriculture and pastures. The current vegetation cover consists mainly of dehesas of holm oaks and cork oaks, as well as grasslands, riparian vegetation, irrigated lands, and urban flora in parks and gardens.

The olive grove is mainly found on the slopes of the Sierra de Santa Bárbara, arranged in terraces, but this area is now heavily urbanized. The holm oak groves are found in dehesas, while the cork oak groves are located in the northern part of the municipality. Cork oak groves cover approximately 1200 ha and also form dehesas like the holm oak groves. In the Valcorchero dehesa, there are mixed areas of holm and cork oaks. Pastures are used for livestock exploitation and often correspond to abandoned croplands. The shrubland in the area mainly consists of broom with pastures, also used for seasonal livestock exploitation.

Riparian vegetation primarily consists of small plantations of poplars. Irrigated lands are concentrated mainly along the banks of the Jerte River downstream of the city, although there are also some family orchards near the urban center.

Fauna

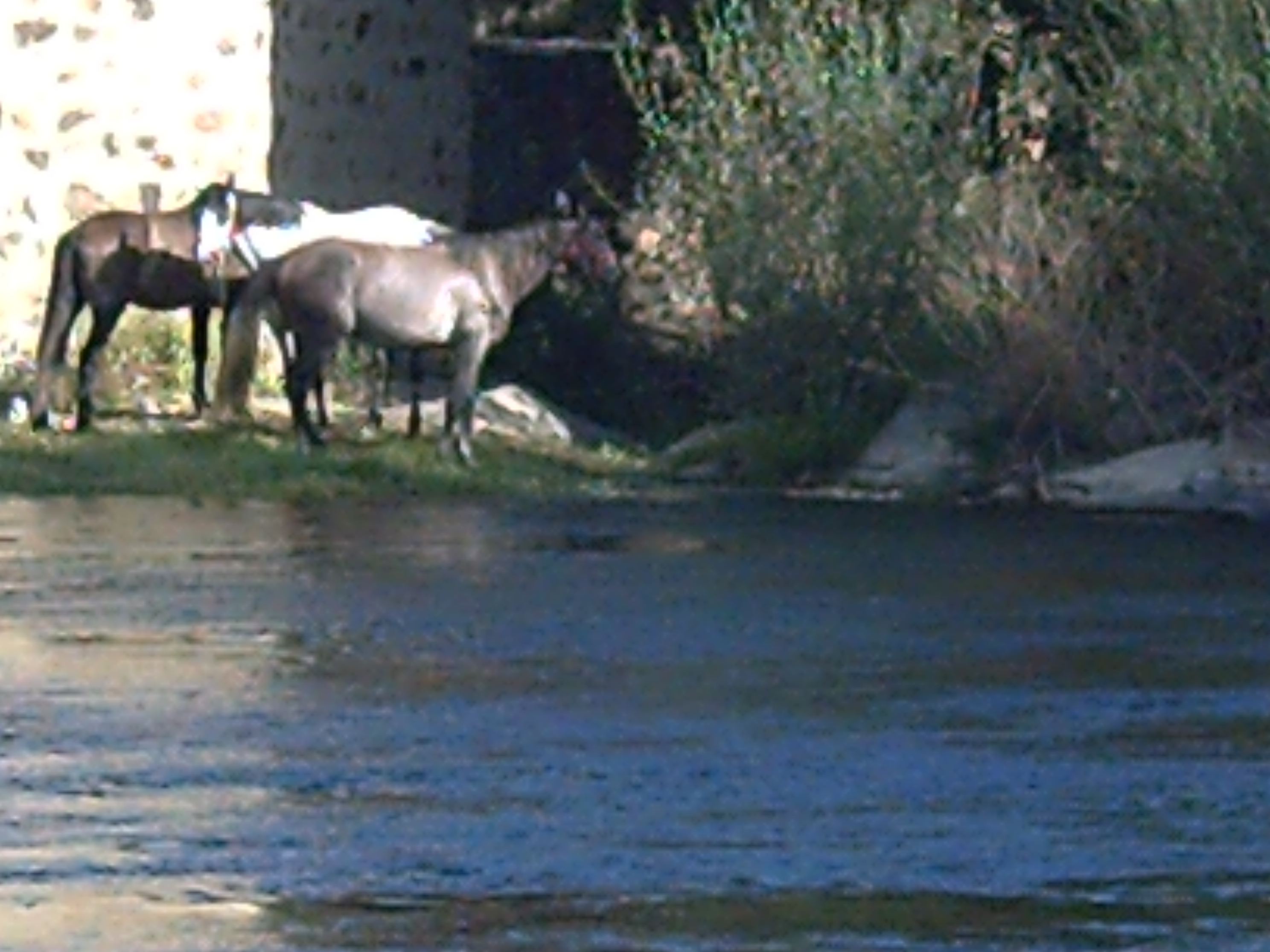
Horses along the Jerte River

The municipality's dehesas are used as pastures for grazing goats, sheep, and cattle. During the summer months, the practice of transhumance brings the livestock to cooler areas of Castile and León. Alongside domestic mammals, there are wild mammals such as various species of voles and field mice, the hedgehog, and the rabbit.

The most diverse group is that of birds. Occasionally, large birds of prey such as booted eagles or peregrine falcons, which live in the Monfragüe National Park and the foothills of the Sierra de Gredos, fly to Plasencia in search of food. The most common bird species are passerines such as the common chaffinch, blue tit, European serin, Iberian magpie, mistle thrush, woodlark, short-toed treecreeper, woodchat shrike, spotless starling, great tit, European goldfinch, common linnet, house sparrow, various species of cuckoo, and, in winter, the wood pigeon. Also present in the municipality are partridges and quails.

Among the amphibians and reptiles in the area, notable species include various types of frogs, the Montpellier snake, the ocellated lizard, several species of lizards, and the common gecko. In the Jerte River and its banks, there are several fish species such as barbel, ide, calandino, tench, and spined loach.

Geology

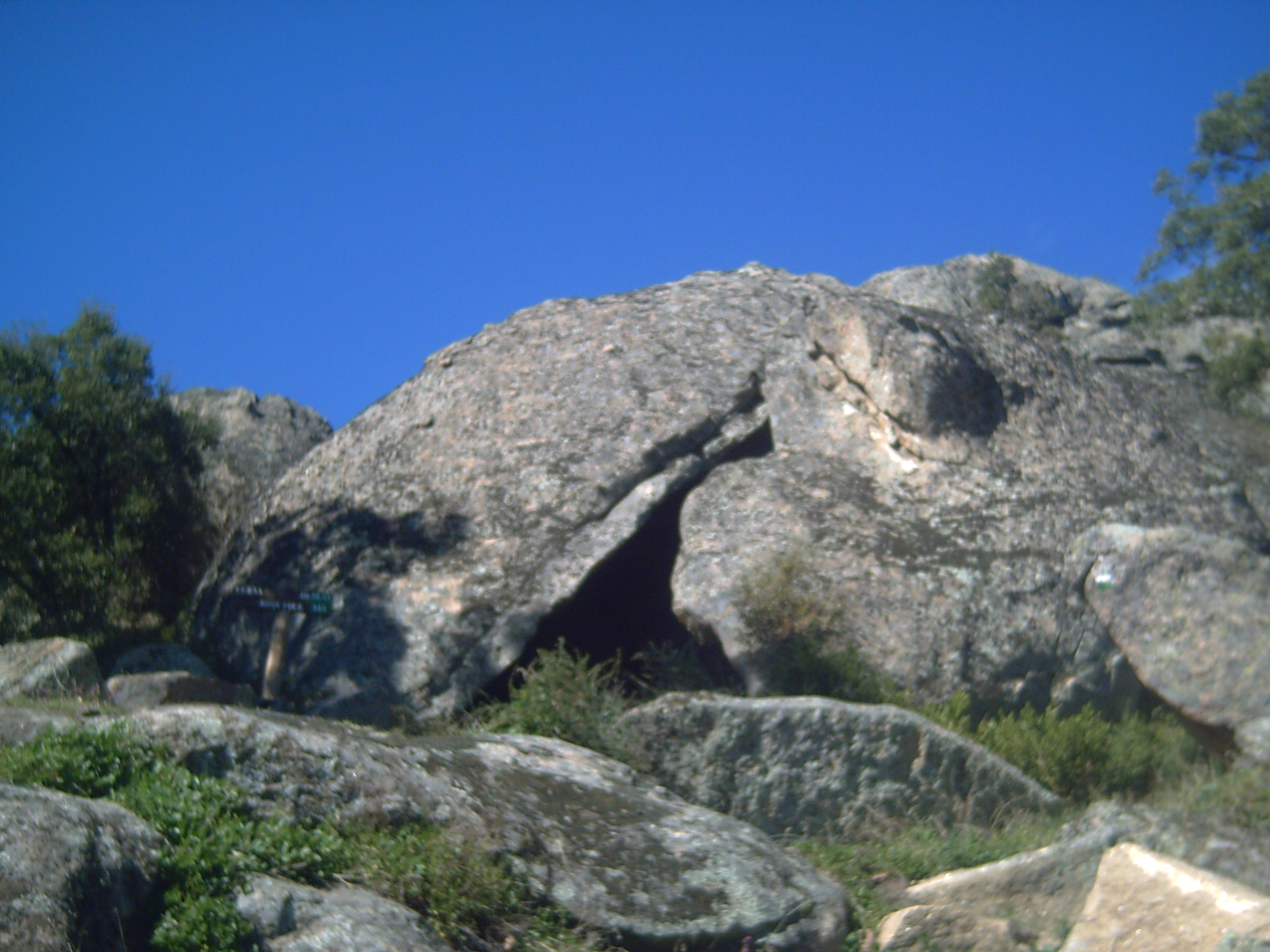
Boquique Cave

The municipality is located within the Hesperian Massif, in the southern part of the Central Iberian Zone. Stratigraphically, Precambrian sediments predominate, consisting of graywackes and slates, as well as granite from the Béjar-Plasencia area.

Tertiary and Quaternary sediments are also found, mainly linked to the fluvial system. Tertiary deposits are located in the Coria basin and the Messejana-Plasencia fault-dike system. Quaternary sediments are more prominent in the various alluvial platforms related to the Jerte River. The most common materials are pebbles of quartz, schists, and granites in a sandy-clayey matrix. Granitic rocks from the Béjar-Plasencia area occupy the northern part of the territory. There are no indications of mineral exploitation in the municipality. There were quarries for extracting various materials, including industrial ceramics, from the Tertiary deposits. However, all of these quarries have been abandoned.

== Demographics ==
Historical population
Year	Pop.	±%
1842	6,026	—
1857	6,844	+13.6%
1877	6,404	−6.4%
1887	7,608	+18.8%
1900	7,965	+4.7%
1910	8,923	+12.0%
1920	10,016	+12.2%
1930	11,805	+17.9%
1940	15,308	+29.7%
1950	17,507	+14.4%
1960	20,962	+19.7%
1970	26,051	+24.3%
1981	31,201	+19.8%
1991	36,060	+15.6%
2001	36,690	+1.7%
2011	41,162	+12.2%
2021	39,862	−3.2%
Source: INE

As of 2025, the population is 40,224, of which 48.1% are males, and 51.9% are females. Minors make up 15.8% of the population, and seniors make up 21.8%.

=== Population entities ===
According to the gazetteer of the INE, the municipal territory of Plasencia includes three population entities: the city of Plasencia, and the settlements of Pradochano and San Gil, with the municipality's population distributed as follows:

Entity	2001	2011	2021	2025
Plasencia (city)	38,233	40,975	39,148	39,817
Pradochano	168	174	147	175
San Gil	175	243	263	232
Total	38,576	41,392	39,558	40,224

=== Migration ===
As of 2025, immigrants make up 7.4% of the population. The 5 largest foreign countries of birth are Colombia, Morocco, Peru, Venezuela, and Bolivia.

According to data published by the INE in the CERA, the electoral census of Spanish residents abroad as of 1 February 2018, there were 839 individuals over 18 years old with Plasencia as their municipality of origin who habitually reside abroad or have transferred their residence abroad.

Demographic evolution of the city in the Old Regime
Year	Source	Population
1591	Libro de los Millones	1,743 families
1754	Catastro of Ensenada	1,070 families
1787	Census of Floridablanca	4,467 inhabitants
1791	Questionnaire of the Royal Audience	1,100 families
1797	Census of Godoy	4,500 inhabitants

== Administration and politics ==
=== Municipal government ===
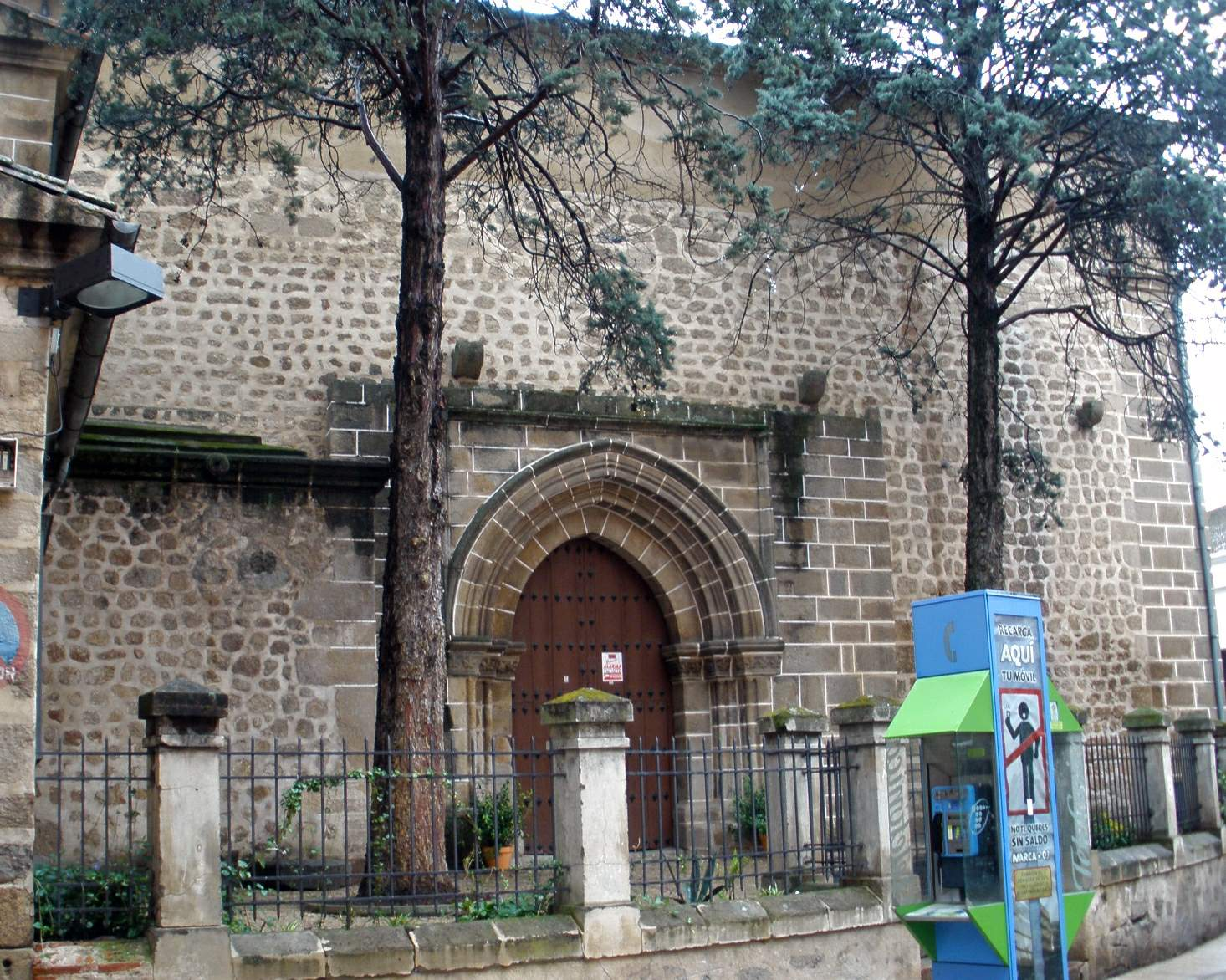
Church of San Esteban, at whose door the assembly known as Corral de los Alcaldes met

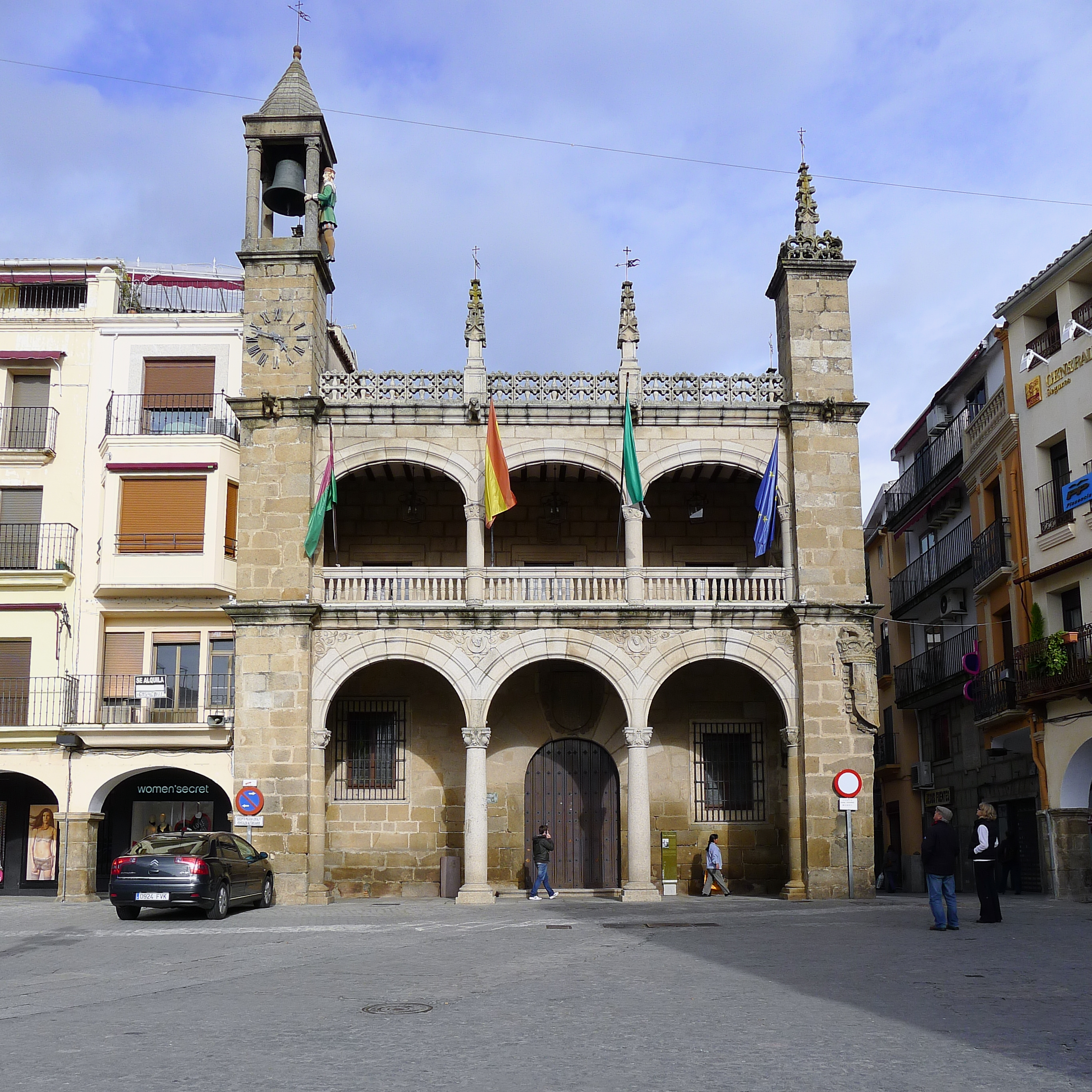
Municipal Palace, in the Plaza Mayor, seat of the Plasencia City Council

Plasencia has enjoyed local autonomy since its founding by King Alfonso VIII of Castile. The existence of a council based in the city is documented as early as 1187, and in 1188, Plasencia attended the Cortes of Carrión as a constituted council. On 8 March 1189, King Alfonso VIII delimited the Plasencia alfoz. The Sexmo of Plasencia, an entity that performed municipal government functions during the Old Regime, had an assembly known as the Corral de los Alcaldes, where all disputes of the community of villages were addressed every Friday. The Corral de los Alcaldes and the council were the two assemblies of the city.

The current Plasencia City Council has its town hall in the municipal palace located on Calle del Rey. During the Old Regime, this building served as the council's seat, with a jail adjacent to it. The original building was constructed between 1517 and 1523 because the previous council house was too small. The municipal palace was modified in the 17th century and rebuilt in the 18th century.

In the term following the 2015 elections, the People's Party governs the municipality with an absolute majority. The mayor is Fernando Pizarro, and the council departments are distributed as follows:

- Council department of Culture
- Council department of Sports, Innovation, Communication, Districts, and Development
- Council department of Education and Heritage
- Council department of Family, Equality, Accessibility, and Dependency
- Council department of Festivities
- Council department of Finance, Urban Planning, and European Funds
- Council department of Youth
- Council department of Human Resources, Employment, Business, Interior, and General Administration
- Council department of Public Health, Municipal Services, and Environment
- Council department of Social Services and Seniors
- Council department of Tourism

List of mayors since the democratic elections of 1979
Period	Mayor	Party
1979-1983	José Luis Mariño	Union of the Democratic Centre
1983-1987	José Luis Mariño	Unión de Placentinos Independientes (UPI)
1987-1989	José Luis Mariño	Democratic and Social Centre
1989-1995	Cándido Cabrera	Spanish Socialist Workers' Party
1995-2003	José Luis Díaz Sánchez	People's Party
2003-2011	Elía María Blanco Barbero	Spanish Socialist Workers' Party
2011–present	Fernando Pizarro García-Polo	People's Party

Results of municipal elections in Plasencia
Political party	2023			2019			2015			2011			2007		
Political party	Votes	%	Councillors	Votes	%	Councillors	Votes	%	Councillors	Votes	%	Councillors	Votes	%	Councillors
PP	10,127	51.63	12	10,292	50.47	12	8,700	42.15	11	11,959	55.21	13	8,799	41.32	10
PSOE	4,749	24.21	6	5,242	25.71	6	5,337	25.86	7	5,275	24.35	6	9,514	44.68	10
Podemos-IU	1,798	9.16	2	1,742	8.54	2	970	4.70	0	1,680	7.76	1	1,007	4.73	0
Vox	1,208	6.15	1	456	2.23	0	108	0.52	0	—	—	—	—	—	—
CS	126	0.64	0	1,129	5.54	1	1,426	6.91	1	—	—	—	—	—	—
Levanta-eXtremeños	679	3.46	0	—	—	—	1,359	6.58	1	—	—	—	—	—	—
Plasencia en Común (PeC)	—	—	—	653	3.20	0	1,349	6.54	1	—	—	—	—	—	—
UPEX	—	—	—	—	—	—	—	—	—	1,262	5.83	1	1,536	7.21	1

=== Territorial organization ===
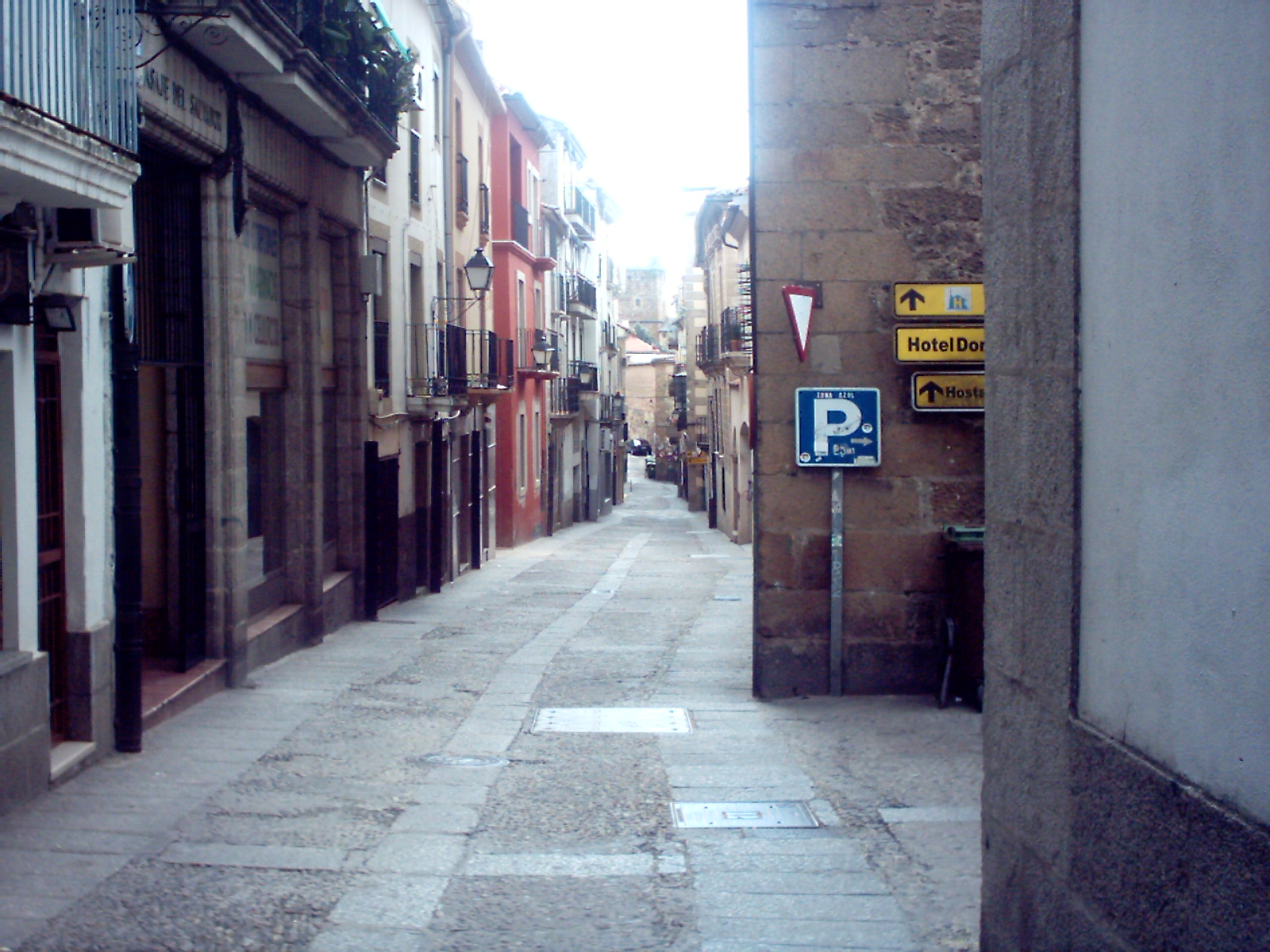
Santa Ana Street, in the city center

Plasencia is divided into twenty-five neighborhoods, twenty-three of which form the municipal capital, each with its own neighborhood association: Colonia Virgen de Guadalupe - La Amistad, Río Jerte, Cotillo de San Antón - Barrio del Pilar, Cerro San Miguel - La Unión, La Esperanza, Sierra Santa Bárbara, Los Mártires, Vera-Elena, Los Alamitos, Miralvalle, Los Majuelos, Valle-Isla, Los Pinos, La Data, Rosal de Ayala, Cuatro Calzadas, Ribera del Valle, Rubén Darío - Gabriel y Galán, San Juan, Ciudad Jardín San Antón, Valcorchero, Los Monjes, and Intramuros de Plasencia. The Plasencia federation of neighborhood associations is located on Fernando Calvo Street.

The other two neighborhoods, San Gil and Pradochano, are population centers that are separate from the municipal capital and have the status of a minor local entity.

=== Personero del Común ===
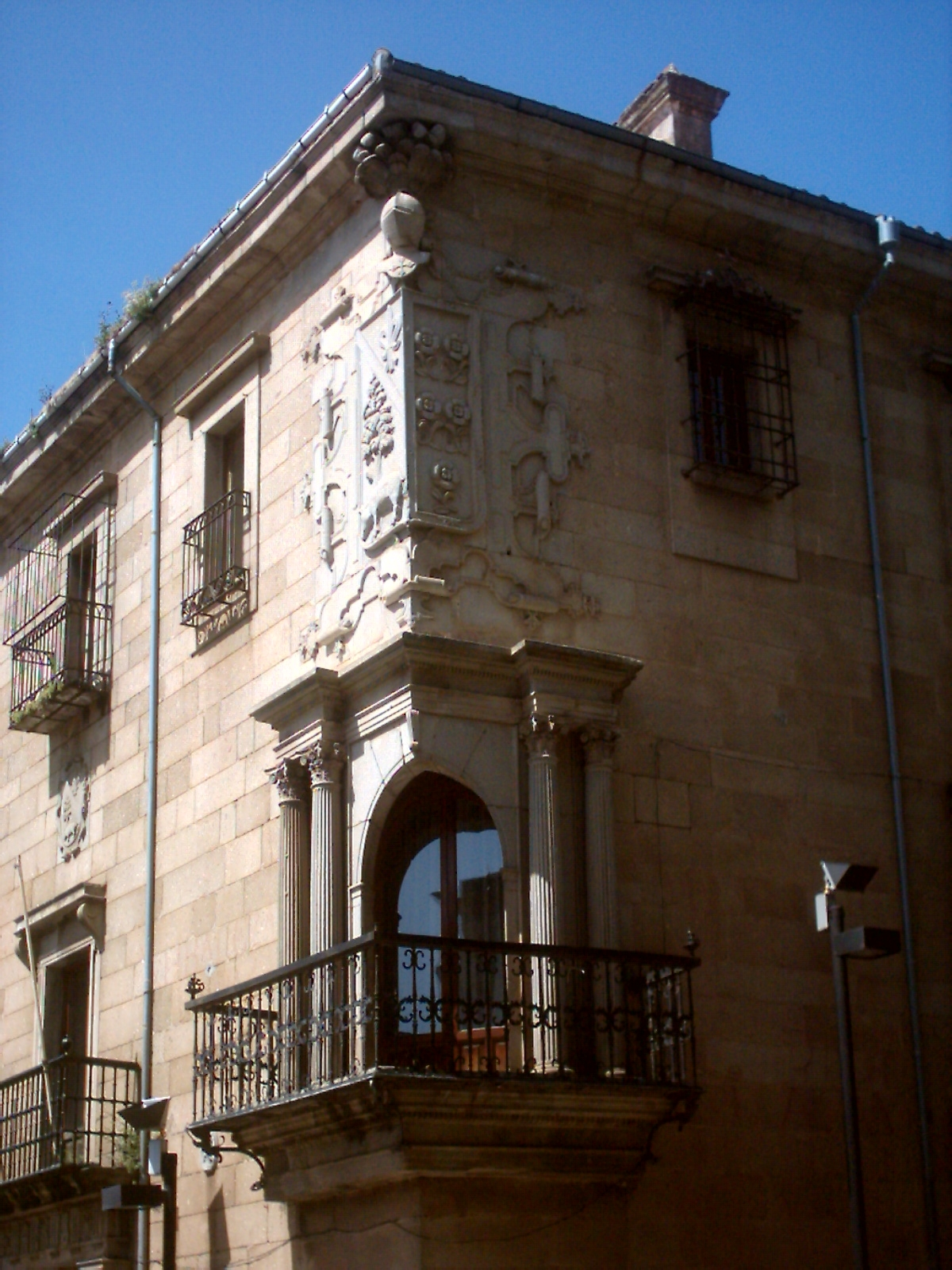
Balcony of the Dean's House

According to the Statute of Autonomy of Extremadura approved in 2011, if Extremadura were to establish an ombudsman at the regional level, it would be named Personero del Común and would be based in the city of Plasencia. For this to happen, the Assembly of Extremadura must pass a law regulating its legal framework, and three-fifths of its members must agree on a person to hold the position, as stipulated in Article 48 of the Statute:

Article 48. Personero del Común.
By a law of the Assembly that will regulate its legal framework, the Personero del Común will be created, based in the city of Plasencia, as a commissioner of the Assembly with functions, regarding regional and local institutions, similar to those of the Ombudsman provided for in the Constitution. The Personero del Común must be elected by three-fifths of the members of the Assembly of Extremadura.

Should the body be established, the city council has offered the Dean's House, a medieval building currently housing the courts until the completion of the new courthouse, as its headquarters.

=== Justice ===
In light blue, municipalities of the Plasencia judicial district

Plasencia is the capital of its own judicial district, which includes sixty municipalities in the northern part of the Province of Cáceres. The district was established as a contemporary judicial district in 1834, following the fall of the Old Regime, with 28 localities, including some now depopulated, such as Asperilla and Corchuelas. Over time, the judicial district expanded, incorporating municipalities from neighboring districts that ceased to exist, including nearly all municipalities from the Granadilla judicial district and the westernmost ones from the Jarandilla judicial district. Plasencia is home to one criminal court, one labor court, and four courts of first instance and investigation.

=== City networks ===
Political-administrative networks

Unlike most municipalities in the province, Plasencia does not form a mancomunidad with its neighboring municipalities. However, it is part of associations with other cities, such as the Council of Large Cities, which aims to improve and streamline relations between large municipalities in Extremadura and the regional government. At an international level, it is also part of the Iberian Border Urban Triangle, alongside Cáceres and the Portuguese cities of Castelo Branco and Portalegre.

Plasencia is also a member of the Spanish Network of Cities for the Climate, which focuses on promoting and managing policies aimed at sustainable development and combating climate change to reduce greenhouse gas emissions and comply with the Kyoto Protocol.

Cultural and monumental networks

Plasencia is part of the Cooperation Network of Cities on the Silver Route, an association of Spanish towns and cities along the Silver Route and its area of influence, aimed at jointly defending and promoting their tourist, historical, cultural, and economic resources. The neighboring municipality of Carcaboso, separated from Plasencia by the Silver Route, is also part of this network.

In the monumental sphere, Plasencia is a member of Cathedral Cities, an association of cities with cathedrals, established in Plasencia in 2006. Also in 2006, the Iberian Forum of Walled Cities was established in Plasencia, bringing together Spanish and Portuguese localities to attract tourism to their walled enclosures and seek European funds for the restoration of their historical-artistic heritage, including the neighboring municipality of Galisteo.

Finally, Plasencia has been a full member of the Red de Juderías de España since February 2008, which aims to preserve the urban, architectural, historical, artistic, and cultural heritage of the Sephardic legacy in Spain and promote the cities within the association. Within the province, Cáceres and Hervás are also members of this network.

== Culture ==
=== Local festivals ===
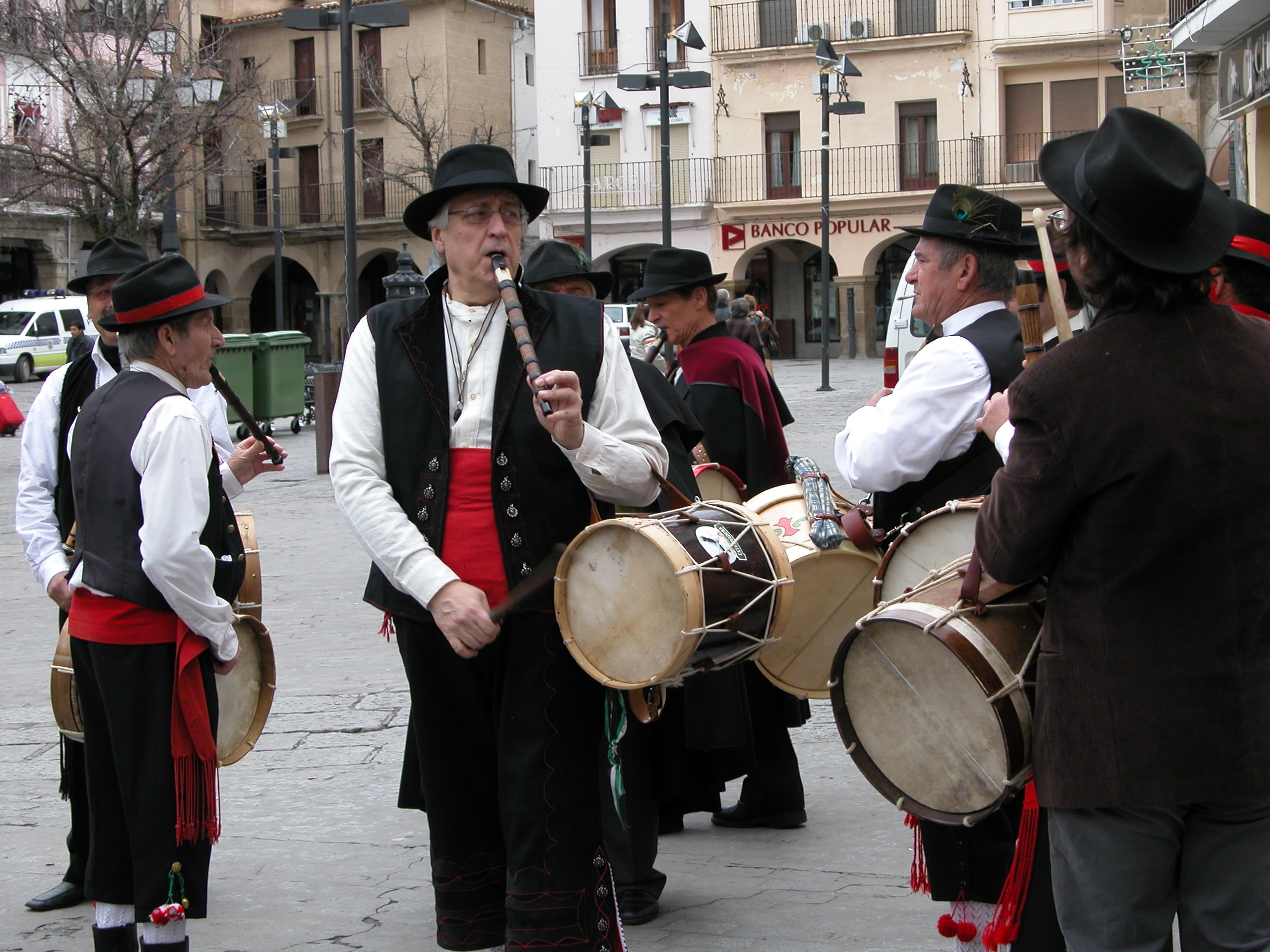
Drummers preparing to perform on San Fulgencio Day

Plasencia is home to several local festivals. Two of these are declared festivals of regional tourist interest: the Plasencia Holy Week and the Martes Mayor. The latter is held annually on the first Tuesday of August, featuring the sale of agricultural and artisanal products from various towns in the region, along with various contests.

In addition to these festivals, the patronal feasts are also significant. The patron saint of the city and its diocese is Saint Fulgentius of Cartagena, whose feast is celebrated on 16 January. The night before is known as the Night of Antruejos because it was customary to dress up, even though Carnival was still far away. The city council and various associations organize the festival, which offers wine, liqueurs, sweets, and migas, all accompanied by music from drummers. Alongside Saint Fulgentius, the Virgin of the Port is also a patroness of Plasencia, with her pilgrimage celebrated on the Sunday following Easter Sunday.

Other city festivals include the fairs held on the second weekend of June, the San Juan neighborhood festival on 24 June, and the Ramo de la Virgen de la Salud, celebrated at the hermitage of the same name in September.

=== Events ===
Gastronomic fairs

In addition to the aforementioned Martes Mayor, Plasencia hosts various gastronomic fairs, such as the Northern Extremadura Gastronomic Encounters in April and May and the Tapas Fair in September and October. Some restaurants in the city also organize gastronomic events that focus on foods such as cod, mushrooms, skipjack tuna, and Iberian pig.

Competitions

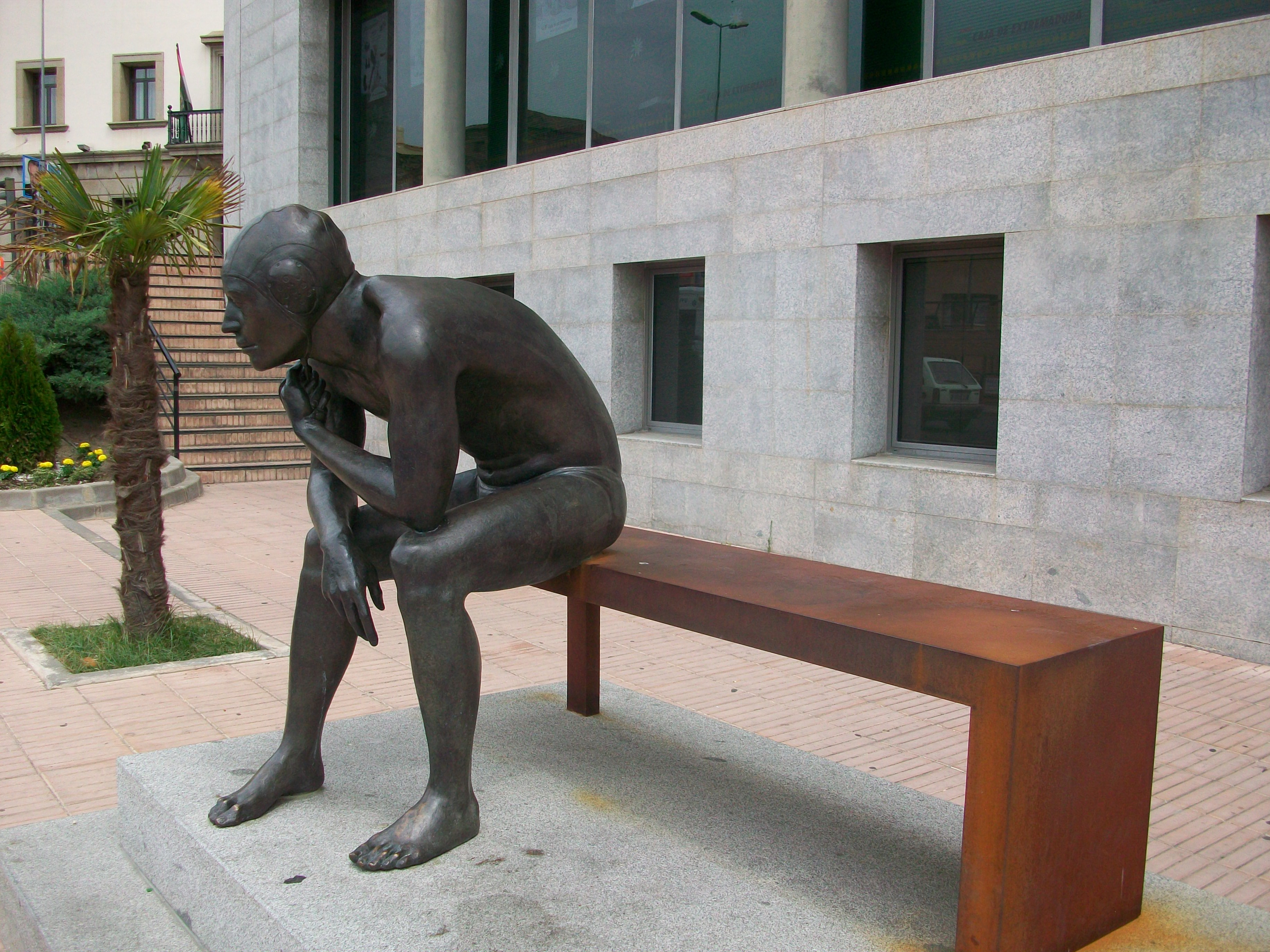
El entrenamiento, a sculpture that won the Caja de Extremadura International Sculpture Prize

The city organizes several painting competitions. Notable among them is the Autumn Salon, organized by Caja de Extremadura annually from 1979 to 2009 and biennially thereafter. There is also an open-air painting competition.

The Caja de Extremadura International Sculpture Prize is held periodically, with winning works installed in various parts of the city, as one of the competition’s goals is to transform Plasencia into an open-air sculpture museum. The first edition in 2006 was won by the sculpture El entrenamiento by the Málaga sculptor Manuel Mediavilla. The second edition was won by El espacio recorrido by the Madrid sculptor Mar Soler.

In terms of photography, the Defensores del Repollo Photographic Competition, organized by the Alimoche collective, stands out. Finally, the Pedro de Trejo cultural association organizes an annual historical research competition.

Festivals

Plasencia is home to several music festivals. The International Folk Music Festival of Plasencia, held the last weekend of August at Torre Lucía, is particularly notable. Other music festivals include the Mayorga Ciudad de Plasencia flamenco singing contest, the Northern Alternative Festival, and the City of Plasencia International Tuna Competition.

Beyond music, the municipality hosts theater events such as the Extremadura Amateur Theater Week and film events such as the Fantastic and Horror Film Week. Another notable event is the Gumiparty computer convention, which, through various performances and activities, aims to promote and introduce contemporary Japanese culture.

=== Cultural centers ===
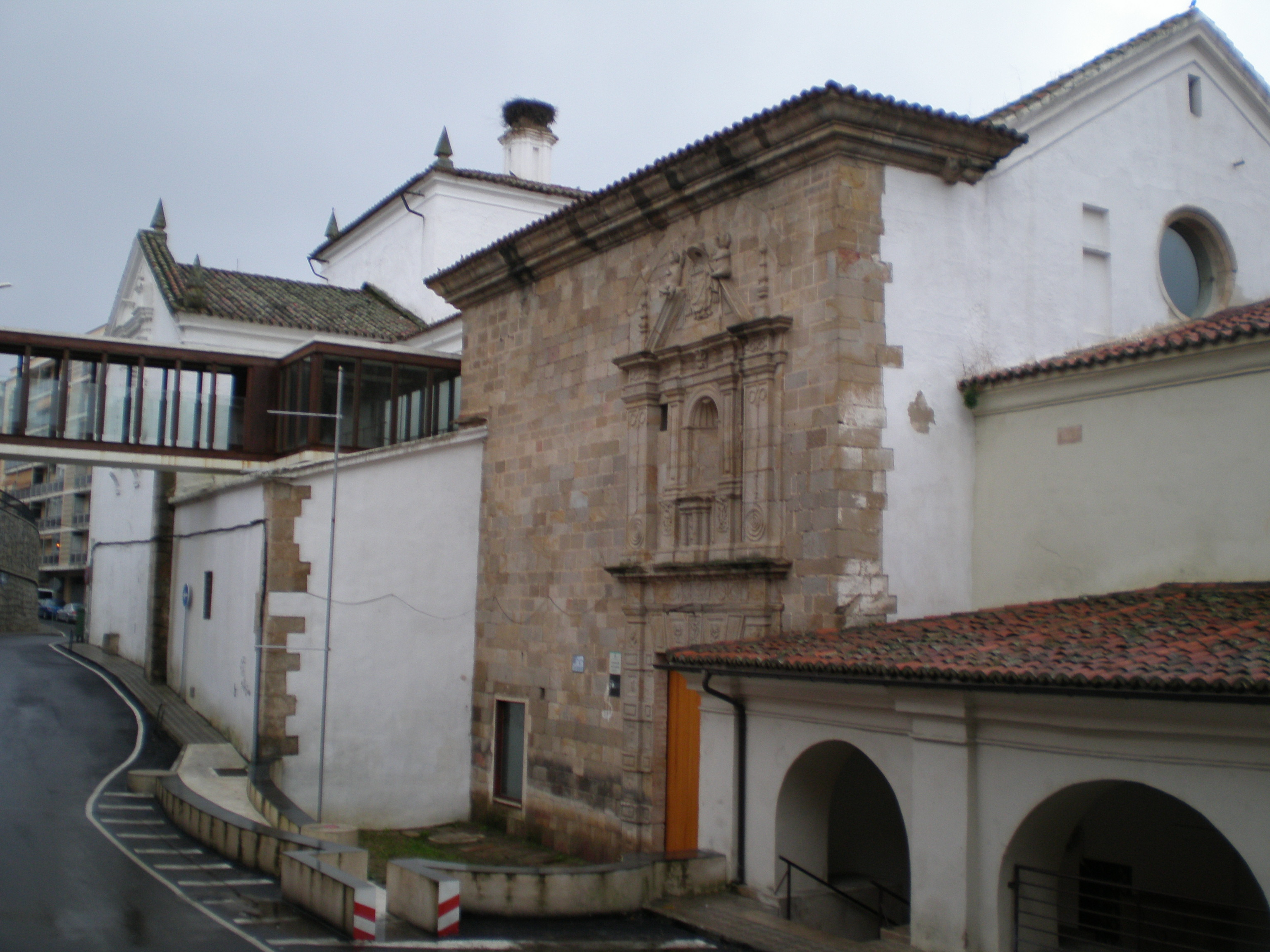
San Francisco Complex

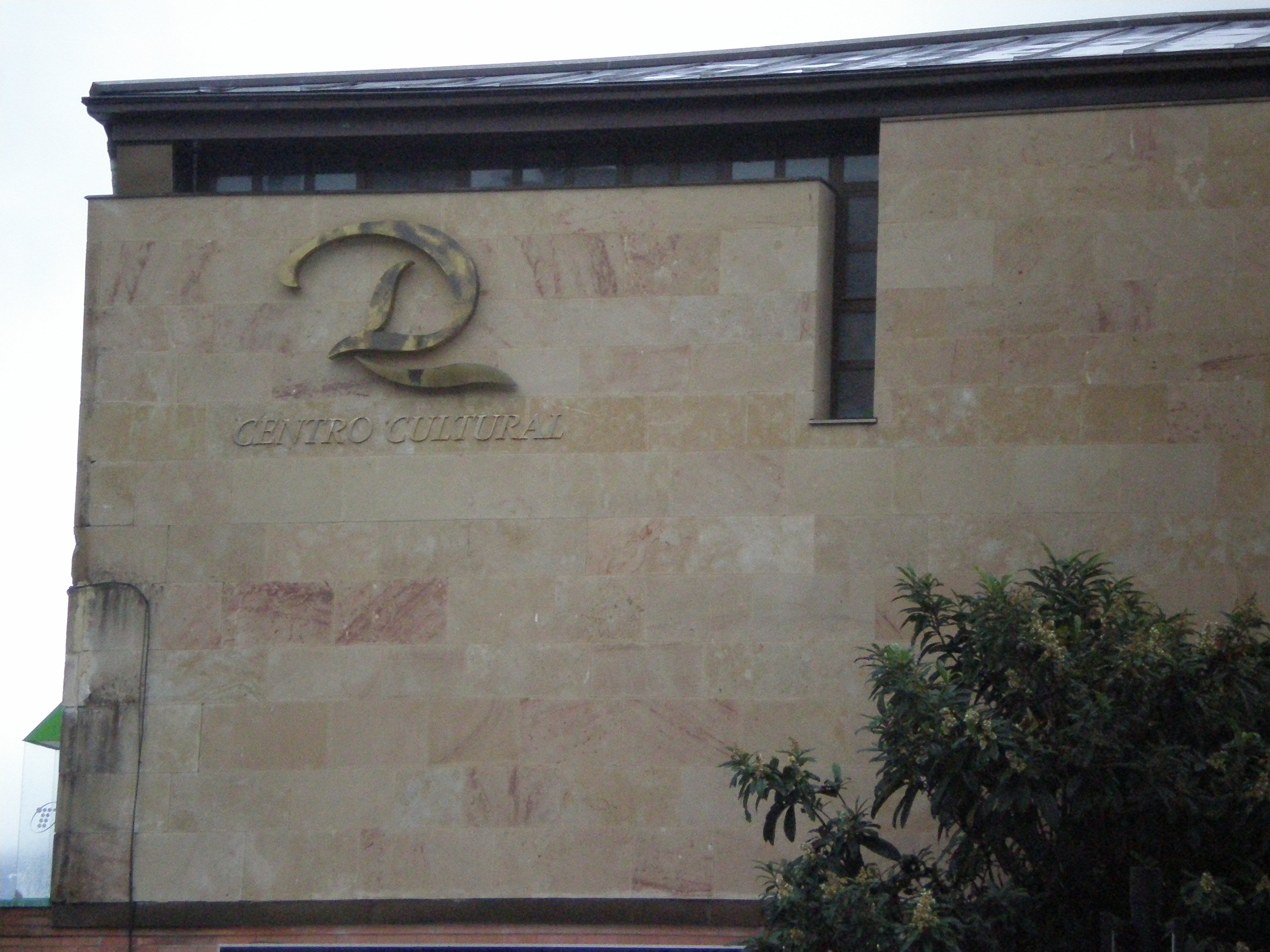
Caja Duero cultural center

Plasencia is home to several theaters and auditoriums, such as the late 19th century Alkázar Theater, the Santa Ana Church used as an auditorium by Caja de Extremadura, and the auditorium of the Santa María cultural complex.

The city is also home to several museums, including the Cathedral Museum in the Old Cathedral, the Pérez Enciso Ethnographic and Textile Museum in the former provincial hospital, the Duke of Arión Hunting Museum in the Marqués de Mirabel Palace, the Holy Week Floats Museum in the Santo Domingo Church, and the Berrocal Open-Air Sculpture Museum. Additionally, there are interpretation centers at Torre Lucía, the Las Tenerías mill, and Los Pinos Park.

In addition to these museums and interpretation centers, the municipality has exhibition halls such as those in the former San Francisco convent, the Santa Clara convent, and the Caja Duero hall, located next to the Puerta de Talavera.

As for libraries, the municipal library is located on Calle Trujillo. Additionally, the La Data and San Miguel neighborhoods have their own libraries, integrated into the Extremadura Library System since 1999.

=== Vía de la Plata ===
The Vía de la Plata, an ancient Roman communication route now used as a hiking trail, holds significant cultural importance in the city. In the Middle Ages, a section near Plasencia served as a border between the Kingdom of Castile, to which Plasencia belonged, and the Kingdom of León, forming a western boundary of the Sexmo of Plasencia and temporarily dividing nearby towns such as Baños de Montemayor and Aldeanueva del Camino into two halves. Following the fall of the Old Regime, the ancient Roman road came to separate the municipality of Plasencia from neighboring municipalities, including Carcaboso, Aldehuela de Jerte, and Galisteo.

From the ancient road, Plasencia has inherited the layout of the modern N-630 and A-66 roads within its municipal boundaries, while the Camino de Santiago has been diverted in its main route, in the opposite direction, to the neighboring towns of Galisteo and Carcaboso. Although the Camino de Santiago does not officially pass through Plasencia on that route, it does so on the Camino de Santiago de Levante: Alicante route, which originates in Alicante and joins the Plata route in Plasencia after passing through Albacete, Talavera de la Reina, and Navalmoral de la Mata.

== Heritage ==
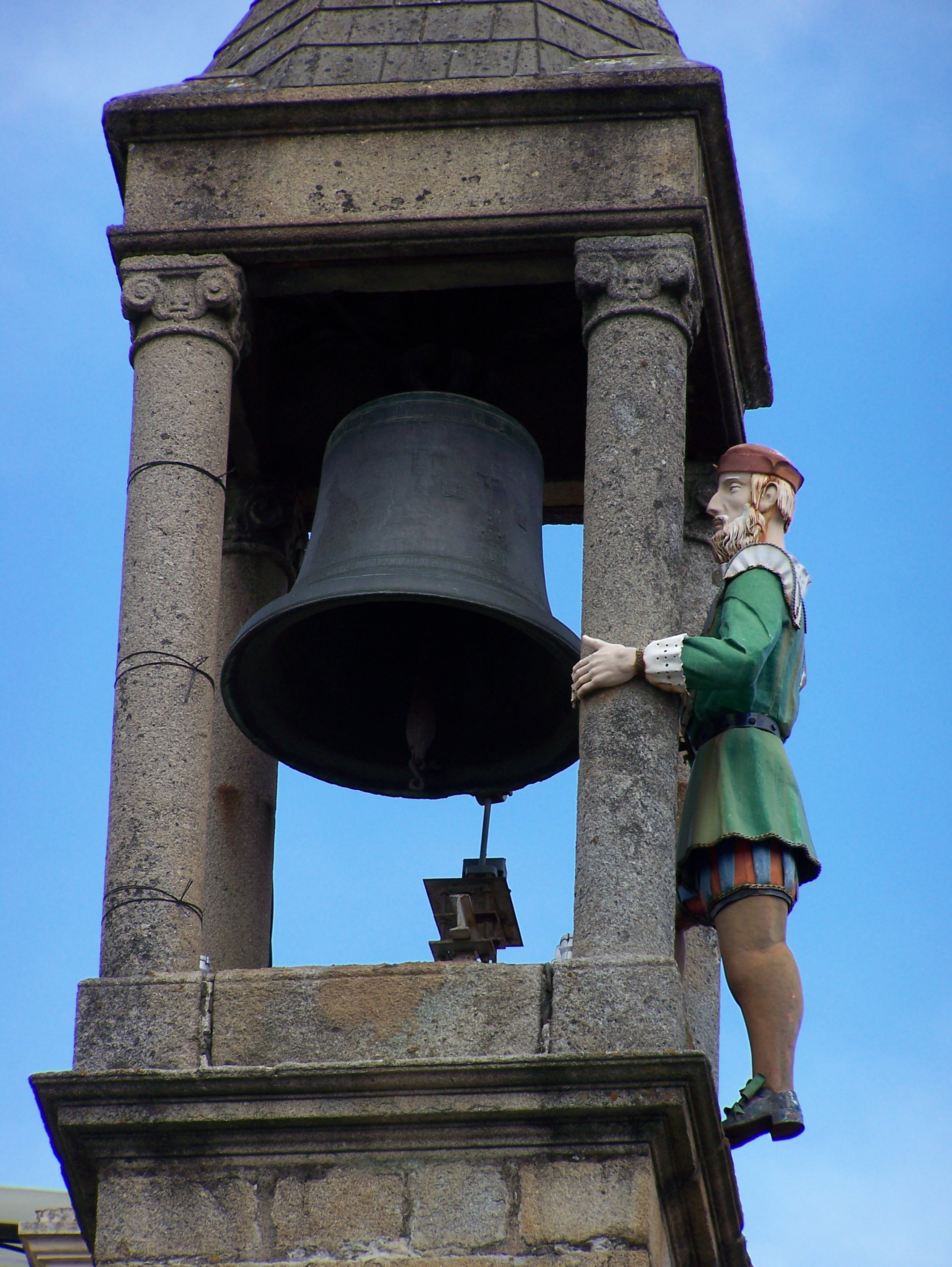
Abuelo Mayorga, an automaton located on the roof of the city hall, considered a symbol of the city

Plasencia is home to a remarkable number of monuments. The city's historic district has been designated a Cultural Interest Asset since 1958, and several individual monuments have been included in the list of Cultural Interest Assets: the Santa María Cathedral, the Carvajal-Girón Palace, and the Mirabel Palace. Additionally, candidates for Cultural Interest Asset status include the Santo Domingo church and convent, the San Nicolás Church, the El Salvador Church, the Virgen del Puerto Sanctuary, and the bullring.

In October 2008, Plasencia, together with Trujillo, Monfragüe National Park, and the Extremaduran dehesa, submitted a joint candidacy for designation as a UNESCO World Heritage Site. That same month, the National Heritage Council included the candidacy on the tentative list of sites aspiring to this designation. However, in July 2009, the Heritage Council decided that Spain’s candidate for this designation would be the Serra de Tramuntana.

=== Religious monuments ===
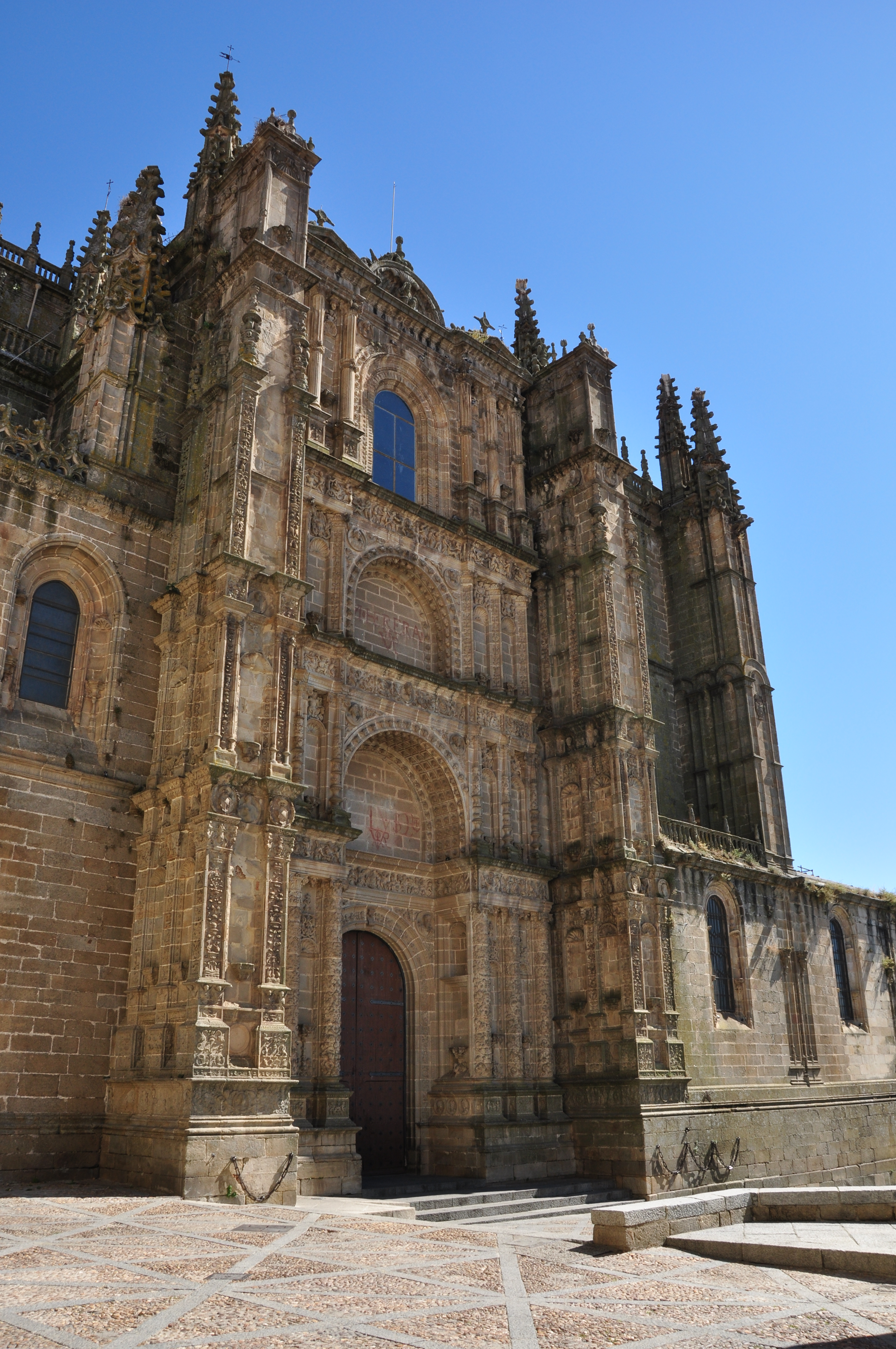
New Cathedral of Plasencia

Plasencia is the seat of the diocese of the same name, and within its urban fabric, there are two cathedrals: the Old Cathedral and the New Cathedral. The Old Cathedral, built in the Romanesque style between the 13th and 14th centuries, features notable work by architects such as Juan Francés. Its chapter house is particularly noteworthy. The New Cathedral, planned in the late 15th century and directed by architects such as Juan de Álava, Francisco de Colonia, Covarrubias, Diego de Siloé, and Rodrigo Gil de Hontañón, was originally intended to replace the Old Cathedral, but construction halted in 1760 due to various issues. Notable features of the New Cathedral include the choir by Rodrigo Alemán and the main altarpiece by Gregorio Fernández.

Within the diocese, the municipality has thirteen parish churches, eleven of which are in the city: Cristo Resucitado, El Salvador, Nuestra Señora de Guadalupe, Nuestra Señora del Pilar, San Esteban, San José, San Miguel Arcángel, San Pedro, Santa Elena, Santa María de la Esperanza, and San Nicolás el Real. Additionally, there are the San Gil Church in the locality of the same name and the Nuestra Señora del Puerto Church in Pradochano.

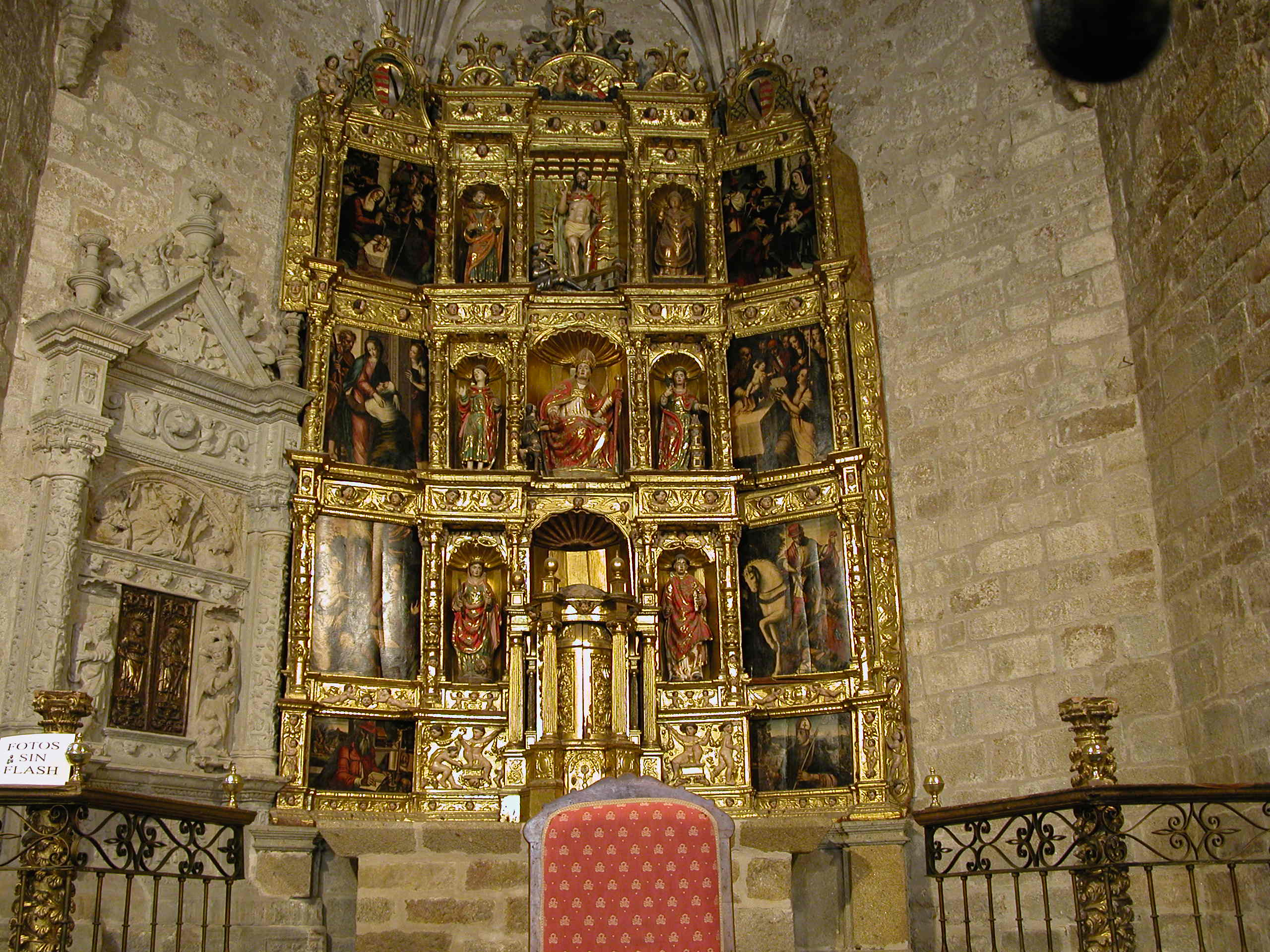
Altarpiece of the San Martín Church

In addition to the parish churches, there are churches not used as parishes, such as the Santa Ana Church, which serves as an auditorium, or the Santo Domingo Church, which houses a collection of Holy Week floats, and the San Martín Church.

Among the hermitages, notable ones include the La Salud Hermitage, Santa Elena Hermitage, and San Lázaro Hermitage. Additionally, there are remains of the Santo Tomé Hermitage, built on the site of a former mosque.

In addition to churches and hermitages, there are also convents, including Las Claras, Las Dominicas, Los Dominicos, San Vicente de Padres Dominicos, Las Capuchinas, Las Ildefonsas, Las Carmelitas, and Los Franciscanos. The Dominicos convent is notable for housing the Plasencia National Hotel.

Other religious buildings include the former Casa de la Salud, now used as the headquarters of the UNED, the apse of La Merced, and the Virgen del Puerto Sanctuary, which houses the statue of the patron saint of Plasencia.

=== City walls ===
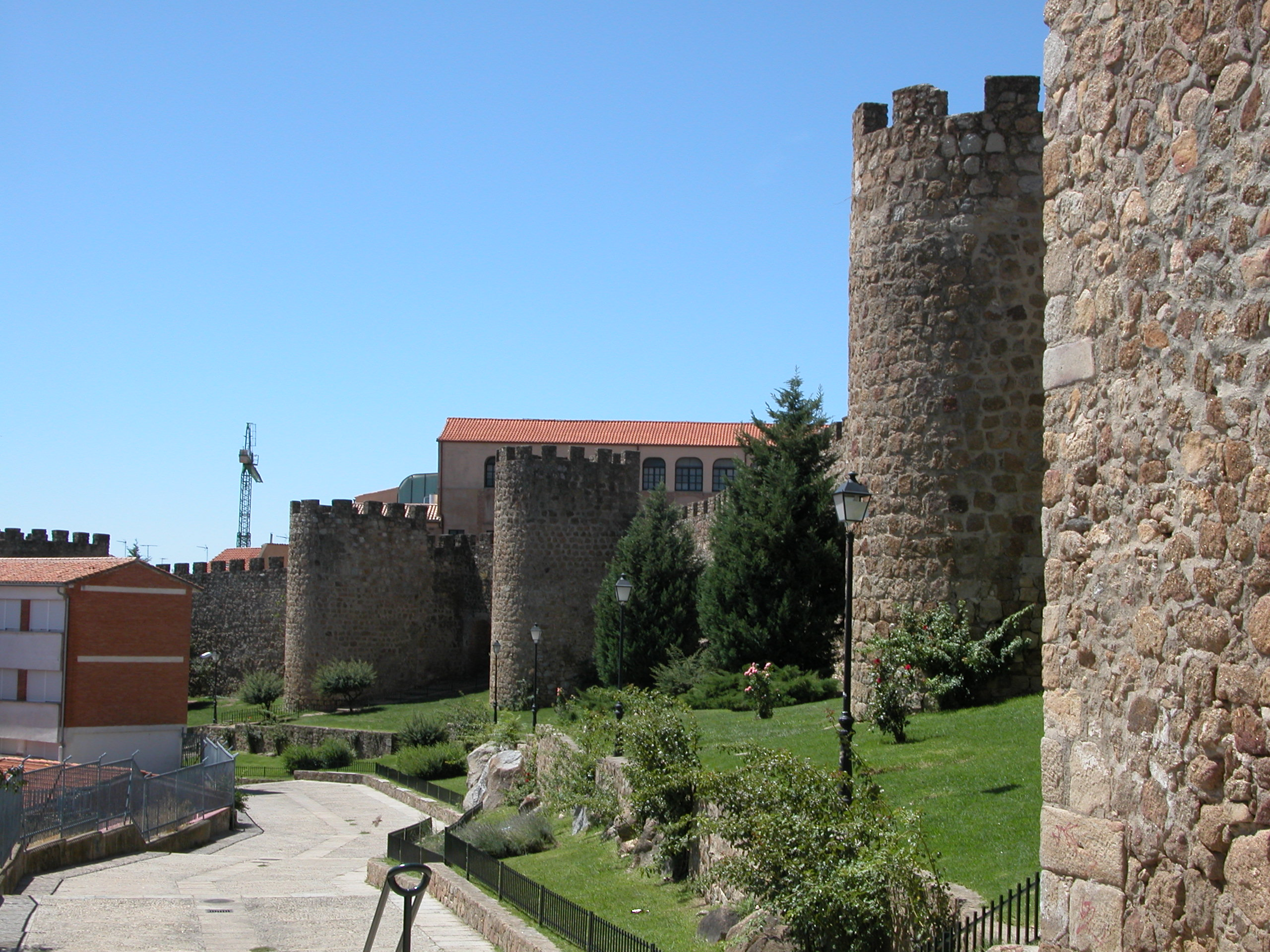
Plasencia city walls

The city walls of Plasencia have protected the old town since the city’s founding, allowing access to the historic center only through its gates: Puerta de Trujillo, Puerta de Coria, Puerta de Berrozanas, Puerta del Sol, Puerta de Talavera, Puerta del Clavero, and Postigo del Salvador.

Adjacent to the walls are notable structures such as the Torre Lucía, a tower where a bonfire was lit at night in the past, serving as a beacon for travelers approaching the city.

=== Civil buildings ===
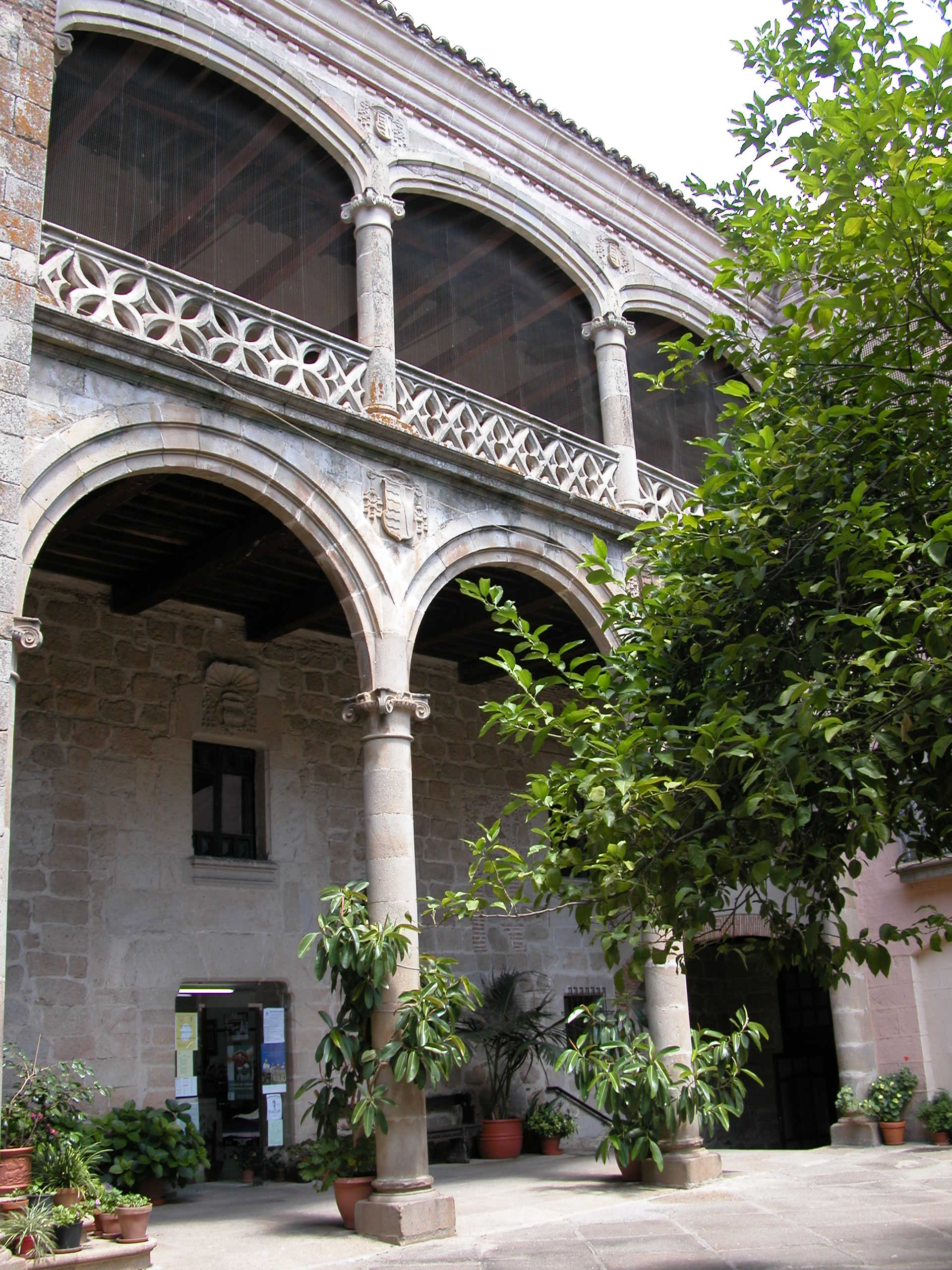
Courtyard of the Episcopal Palace

As a result of having been inhabited by various noble families in the past, the city retains a significant number of palaces and stately homes. Notable palaces include the Marqués de Mirabel Palace, the municipal palace, the Monroy Palace or House of the Two Towers, the Almaraz Palace, the Carvajal-Girón Palace, and the Episcopal Palace. The main stately homes include the Casa del Deán with its adjacent Casa del Doctor Trujillo, the Casa de las Infantas, and the Casa de las Argollas.

Other notable buildings include former educational centers. During the 15th century, several higher education institutions were founded in Plasencia, and in 1446, at the request of Bishop Juan de Carvajal, the first university studies in Extremadura were established in the city. Among the historic educational buildings are the aforementioned UNED headquarters, formerly a Jesuit convent, and the Plasencia Campus, which was previously an orphanage for girls and later a military barracks.

The city also retains remains of several hospitals that, although now used for other purposes, were historically significant in the development of the city’s healthcare system. These include medieval hospitals such as Sancti Spiritus, Santa María, San Marcos, Arcediano, and La Merced, as well as more modern buildings such as the Convalescent Hospital and San Roque.

Other civil structures include the Casa de la Alhóndiga, used as a youth information center, the former 17th century prison, and the former flour factory acquired by the city council in 2008.

=== Water monuments ===
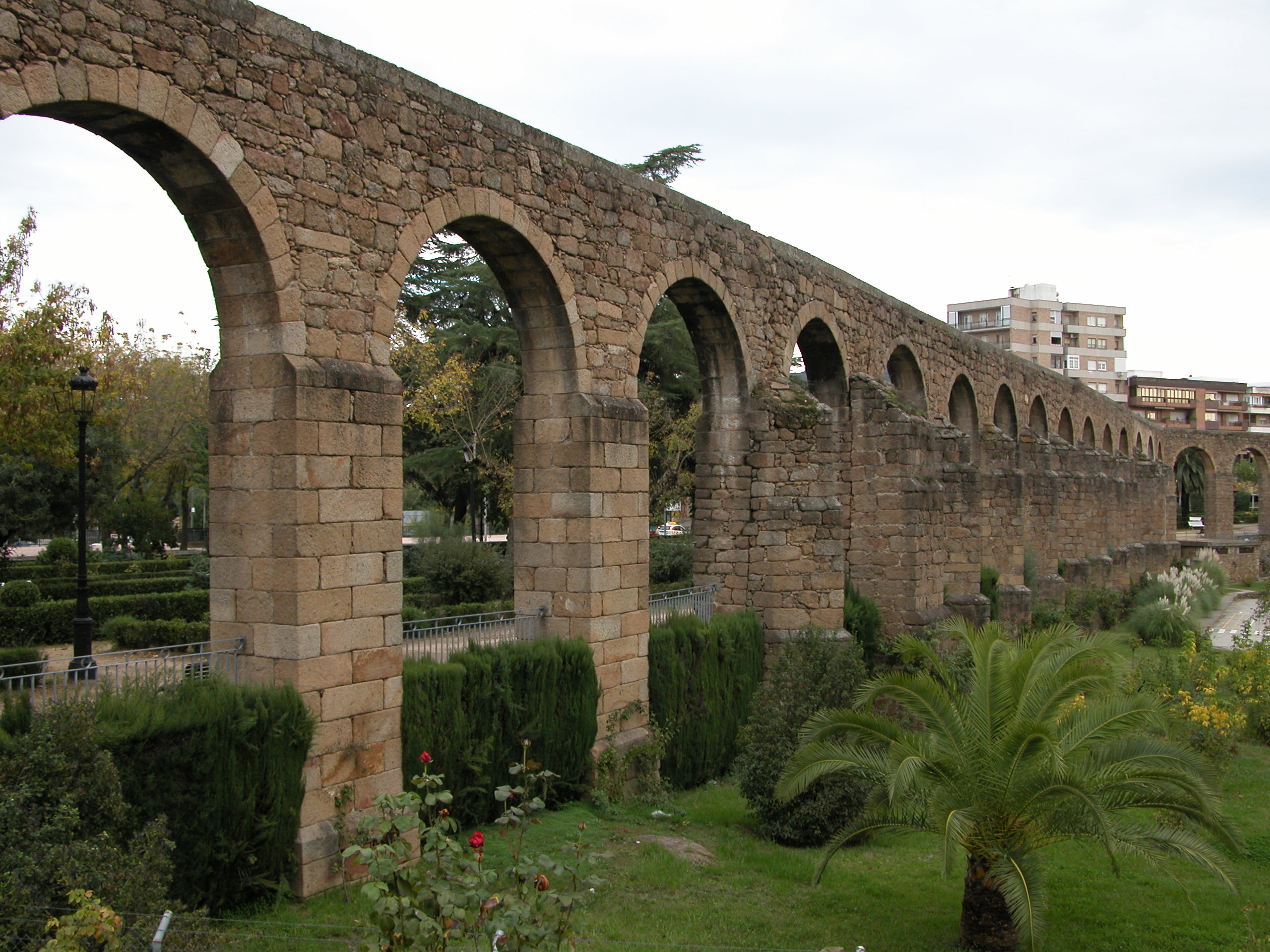
Plasencia Aqueduct

The medieval Plasencia aqueduct was built in the 16th century, replacing an earlier structure from the 12th century. It brought water to the city from Cabezabellosa and El Torno. Fifty-five arches remain, most of them in the San Antón neighborhood, known as the Arcos de San Antón. Other arches stand in a picnic area next to the hospital.

The city has three monumental bridges crossing the Jerte River within its boundaries. One is the Puente Nuevo, designed by Rodrigo Alemán and built in the 16th century as an entrance to the city from La Vera and the Valle del Jerte, featuring a shield of the Catholic Monarchs and a niche with an image of Our Lady of Cabeza. The oldest bridge is the Puente de San Lázaro, located next to the hermitage of the same name and built in the 16th century in the Gothic style. The other historic bridge is the Puente de Trujillo, through which the Vía de la Plata passes.

Plasencia has several fountains, including the Fuente de la Cruz de Mayo and the Caño de San Pedro, which historically supplied water to the residents of the walled city and is decorated on the Cruz de Mayo day. Other fountains include the Fuente del Cabildo, located in front of the New Cathedral, and the Fuente de San Nicolás.

=== Squares, streets, and neighborhoods ===
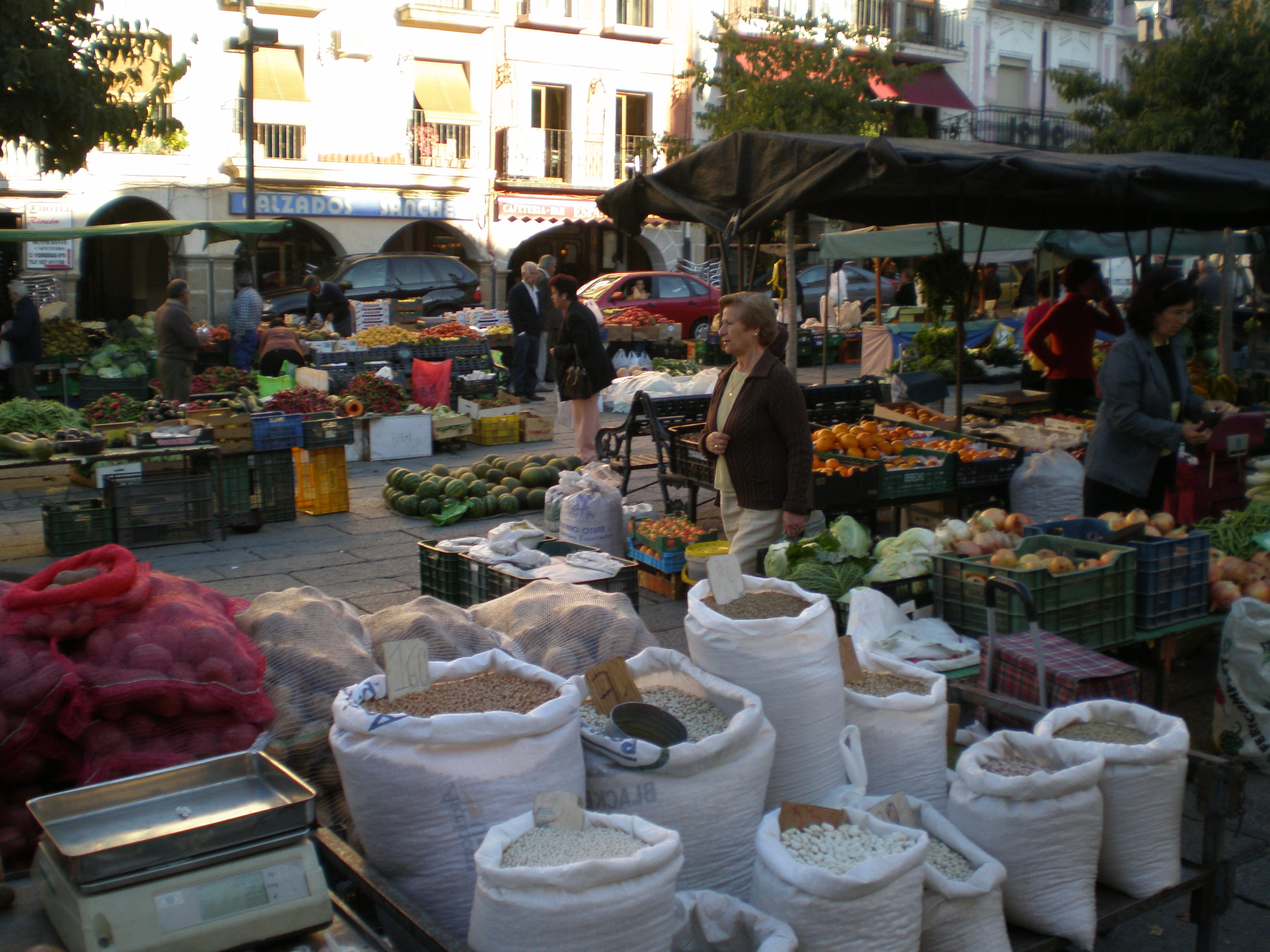
Traditional Tuesday market

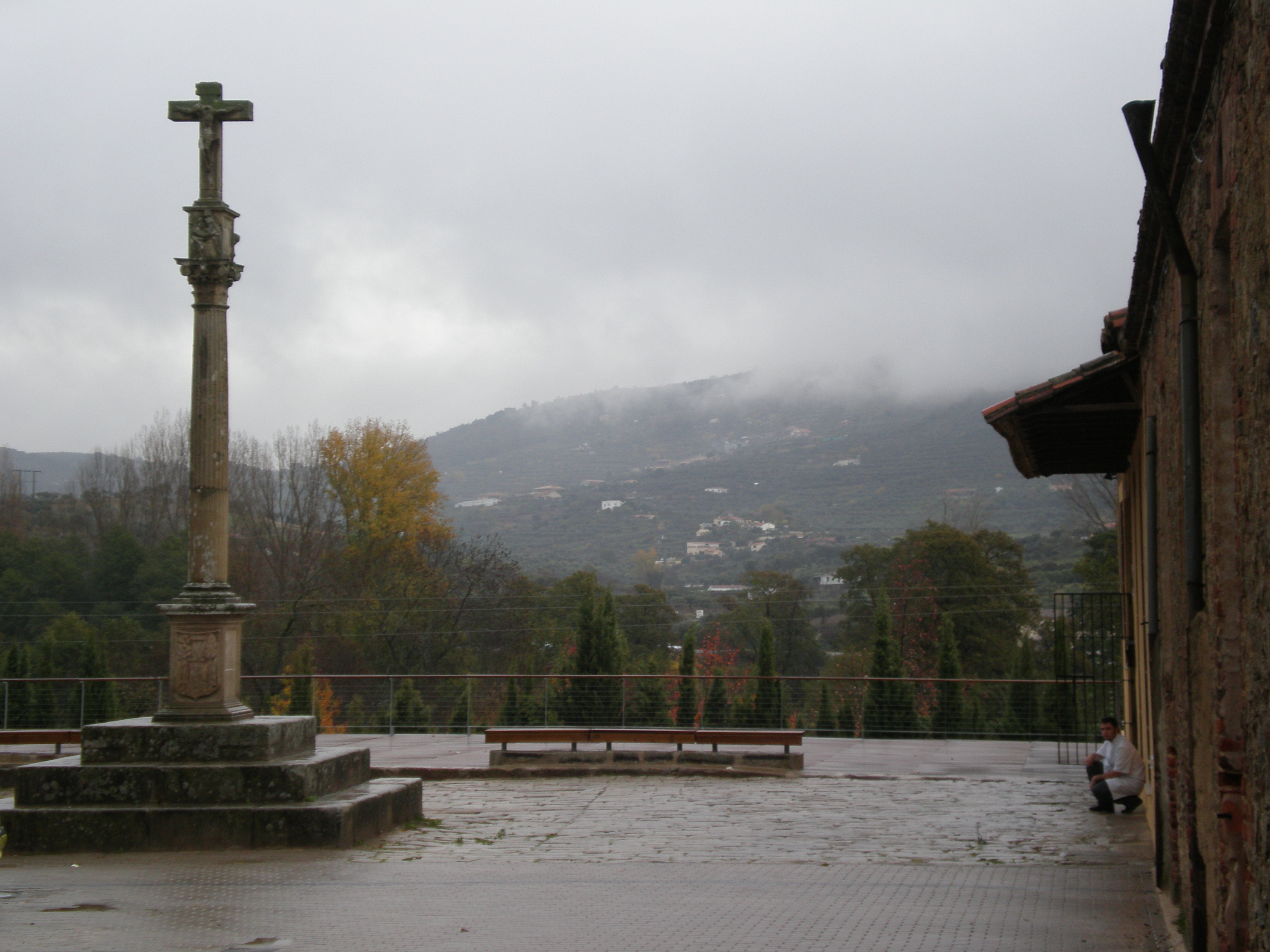
Plaza de la Cruz Dorada

One of the most prominent public spaces in the city is the Plaza Mayor. It houses the city hall and the automaton popularly known as the Abuelo Mayorga. The square also hosts a free market that has been held every Tuesday since the Middle Ages, attracting farmers and market gardeners from nearby towns to sell their products, as well as livestock traders for their transactions.

Another notable place is the Plaza de la Cruz Dorada, located near the Jerte River and framed by the apse of La Merced and the San Francisco convent. At its center stands a calvary that gives the square its name.

Plasencia has its own Jewish quarter. Additionally, in the area known as El Berrocal, there is the only Jewish cemetery in Extremadura, which began restoration in 2005.

=== Archaeological remains ===
The main archaeological site in the municipality is the Boquique Cave, located on the outskirts of the city in the Valcorchero dehesa. It is named after having served as a refuge for the 19th-century military figure Mariano Ceferino del Pozo, who was nicknamed "Boquique." The cave yielded the first remains of the so-called Boquique pottery.

Archaeological excavations have been conducted at various points in the city, such as Calle Matías Montero, where works under the Plan E uncovered remains of what may have been an ancient defensive or retaining wall, and Calle Esparrillas.

=== Natural heritage ===
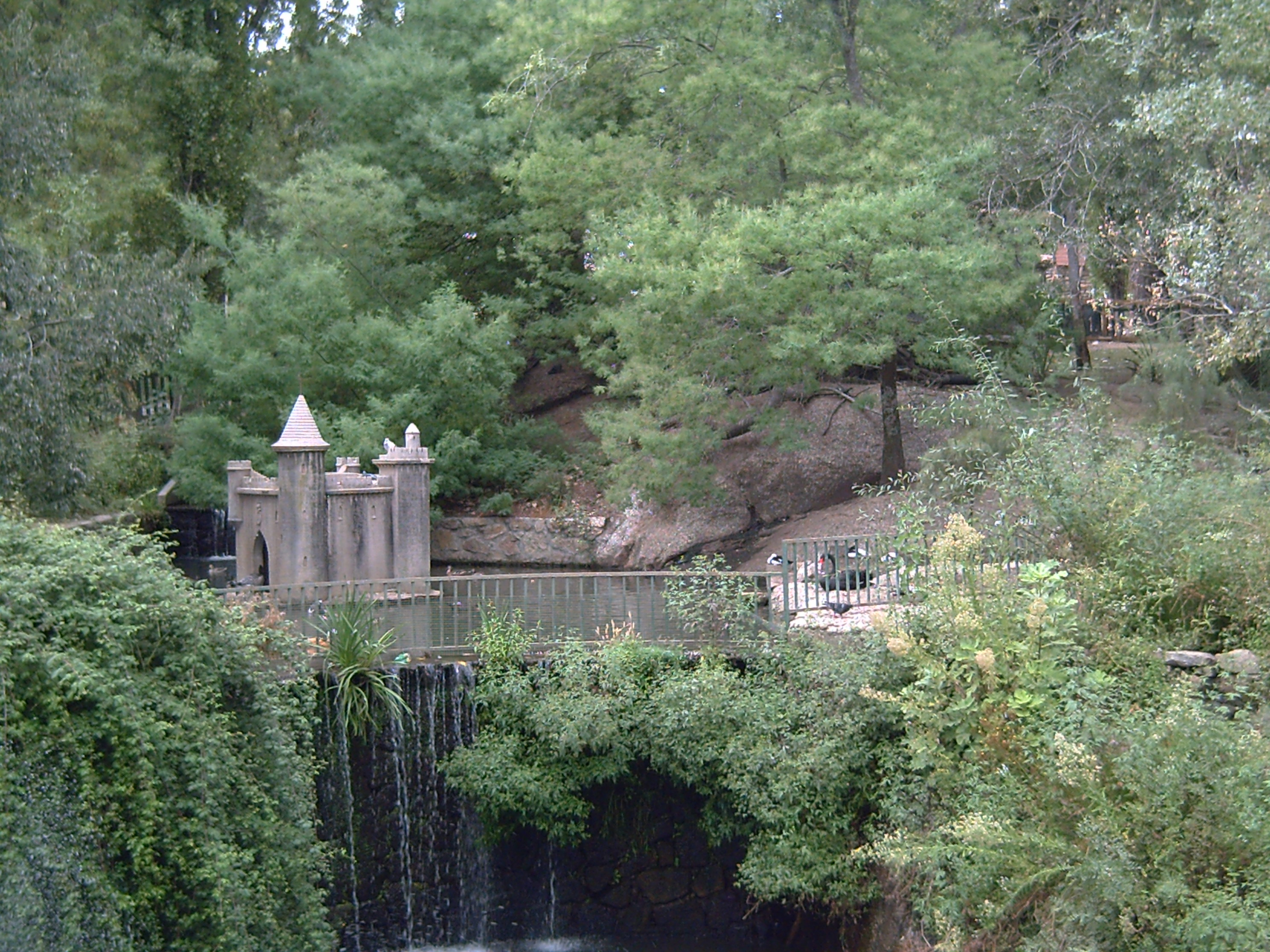
Los Pinos Park

Plasencia is home to notable parks and gardens. In the city center, there is a significant cluster of four parks: Coronación, Los Pinos, Los Caídos, and San Antón. The Coronación Park was commissioned by Calixto Payáns, Marquis of Constancia and lord of Barrado, and is located opposite the Plasencia Campus, having previously served as a fairground. Los Pinos Park was created by prisoners from the Republican faction after the Spanish Civil War and is an extensive botanical garden inhabited by various species of birds and trees from different parts of the world, featuring an open-air sculpture museum. The Los Caídos Park, also known as the Frog Park, was built in 1942 with debris from the demolition of the alcázar. San Antón Park connects the other three parks and is named after the San Antón hermitage, which stood there until the early 20th century and has since disappeared.

Another significant park is the Parque de la Isla, located on the island formed by the Jerte River splitting into two branches in its urban stretch. It is the largest park in the municipality, covering approximately 10 hectares. It is known for being a hunting ground for King Philip V of Spain when he lived in Plasencia, and it was one of his favorite places in the city where he spent much of his time. Also located along the Jerte River is the Parque del Cachón, the newest park in the city.

Among protected natural spaces, Valcorchero y Sierra del Gordo stands out, declared a protected landscape in 2005 by the Government of Extremadura following a 2004 request by 40 associations grouped under the Valcorchero: Protégelo coordinating body and 100 individuals.

== Economy ==
=== Primary and secondary sectors ===
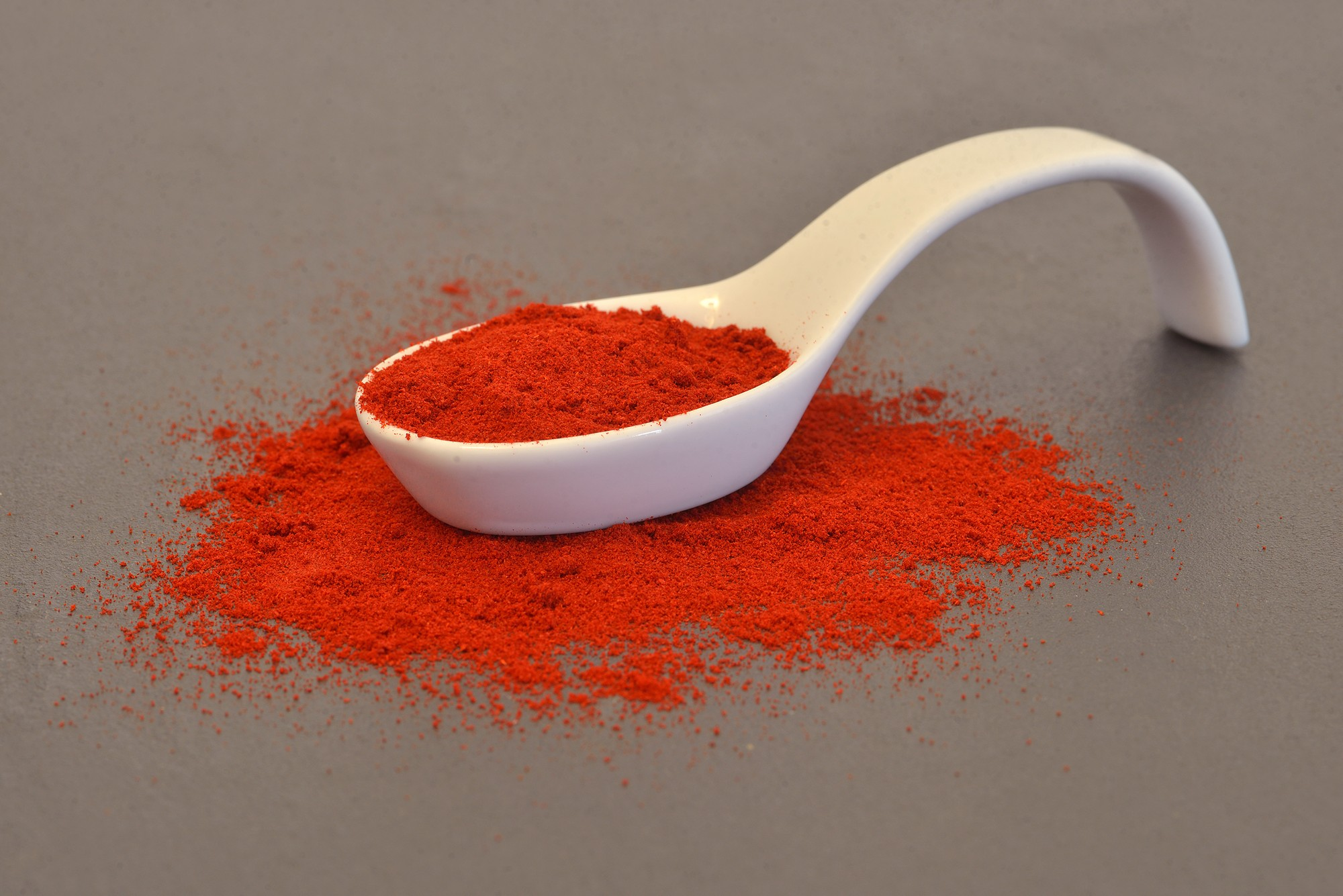
Smoked paprika from La Vera

In the primary sector, the municipality has two colonization settlements built in the 20th century, San Gil and Pradochano. Additionally, since 2009, Plasencia has been the headquarters of the National Center for Research and Development in Organic Agriculture.

Regarding the secondary sector, Plasencia has an industrial estate. In 2013, according to the economic yearbook of La Caixa, the municipality had 153 industry companies and 274 construction companies.

Within both sectors, the municipality is part of the production and processing area for five food products with designation of origin or protected geographical indication: Carne de Ávila, Cordero de Extremadura, Ternera de Extremadura, Jamón de Huelva, and Pimentón de la Vera.

=== Commercial activity ===
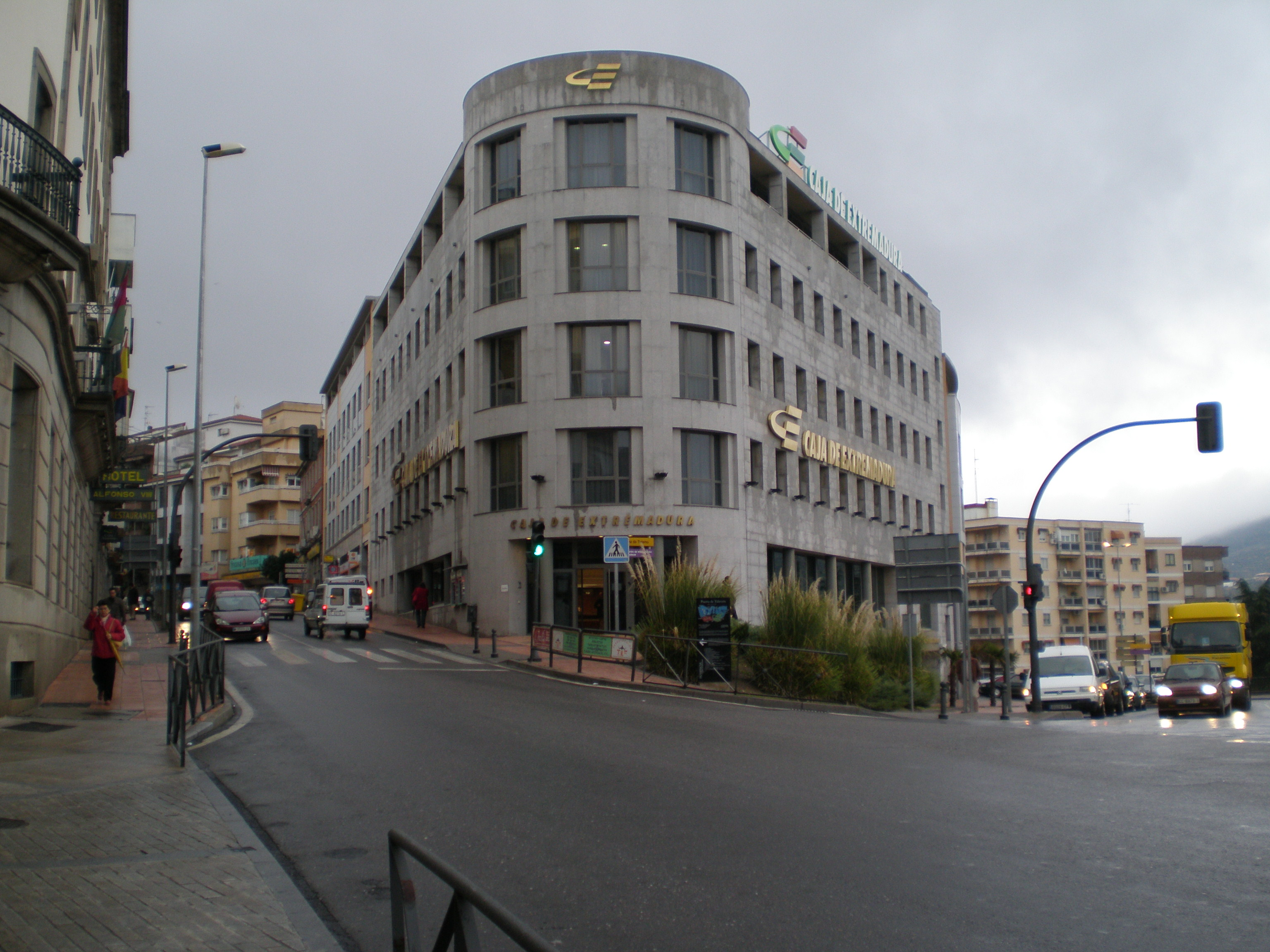
Building of Liberbank in Plasencia

There is a wide range of commercial activity in Plasencia. According to the 2013 economic yearbook of La Caixa, the city is the hub of one of the four commercial areas into which Extremadura is divided. In 2012, the Plasencia commercial area had a population of 126,488, meaning that 68% of the potential clientele for Plasencia's businesses resided outside the municipality that year.

In 2013, Plasencia had 38 deposit institutions, 296 bars and restaurants, 189 wholesale businesses, 864 retail businesses, and one shopping center. Regarding accommodation services, the municipality has various establishments, including rural houses, hostels, and hotels.

Though not exclusively, commerce is predominantly concentrated in the streets of the old town leading to the Plaza Mayor, particularly on Calle del Rey and Calle del Sol. The latter is the most expensive commercial area in Extremadura. Another notable commercial point, used only for temporary occasions, is the El Berrocal fairground.

Throughout most of the 20th century, Plasencia was home to its own savings bank, the Plasencia Savings Bank. Founded in 1911 by the Catholic social center of the City of Plasencia, promoted by the Diocese of Plasencia, it merged in 1990 with the Cáceres Savings Bank to form Caja de Extremadura (now Liberbank).

== Services ==
=== Supply ===
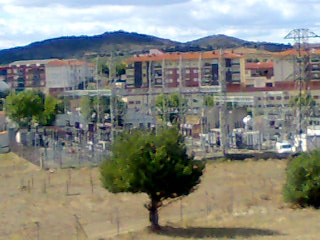
Electrical substation in Plasencia

Drinking water

The city receives its drinking water from a dam located on the Jerte River. Water is drawn from the dam through a water intake tower and transported by gravity to the water treatment plant located on the N-110 road, where it is purified. The treated water is transferred to two reservoirs, located in Los Pinos Park and the industrial estate, from which the population is supplied.

Sanitation is carried out through a network of concrete pipes used for both urban and industrial wastewater. Urban wastewater does not require pumping and is transported by gravity alone, except in some areas that need discharge chambers. The municipality has a wastewater treatment plant next to the N-630 road, which receives wastewater from both Plasencia and the Valle del Jerte.

Energy

Several electricity lines of different voltages cross the municipal territory of Plasencia, from 400 kV lines that directly transport electrical energy from the Almaraz Nuclear Power Plant to lower-voltage lines that distribute energy to surrounding populations. These latter lines connect to the three electrical substations in the municipality: Plasencia, Plasencia Industrial, and Valcorchero. The first is the most significant, as it distributes energy from 150 to 220 kV lines to substations in the area.

Regarding fuel supply, the city has five filling stations, three operated by Repsol, one by Cepsa, and one by Carrefour. For the transport of natural gas, a primary gas pipeline connecting the compression stations of Almendralejo and Coreses passes through the city.

=== Education ===
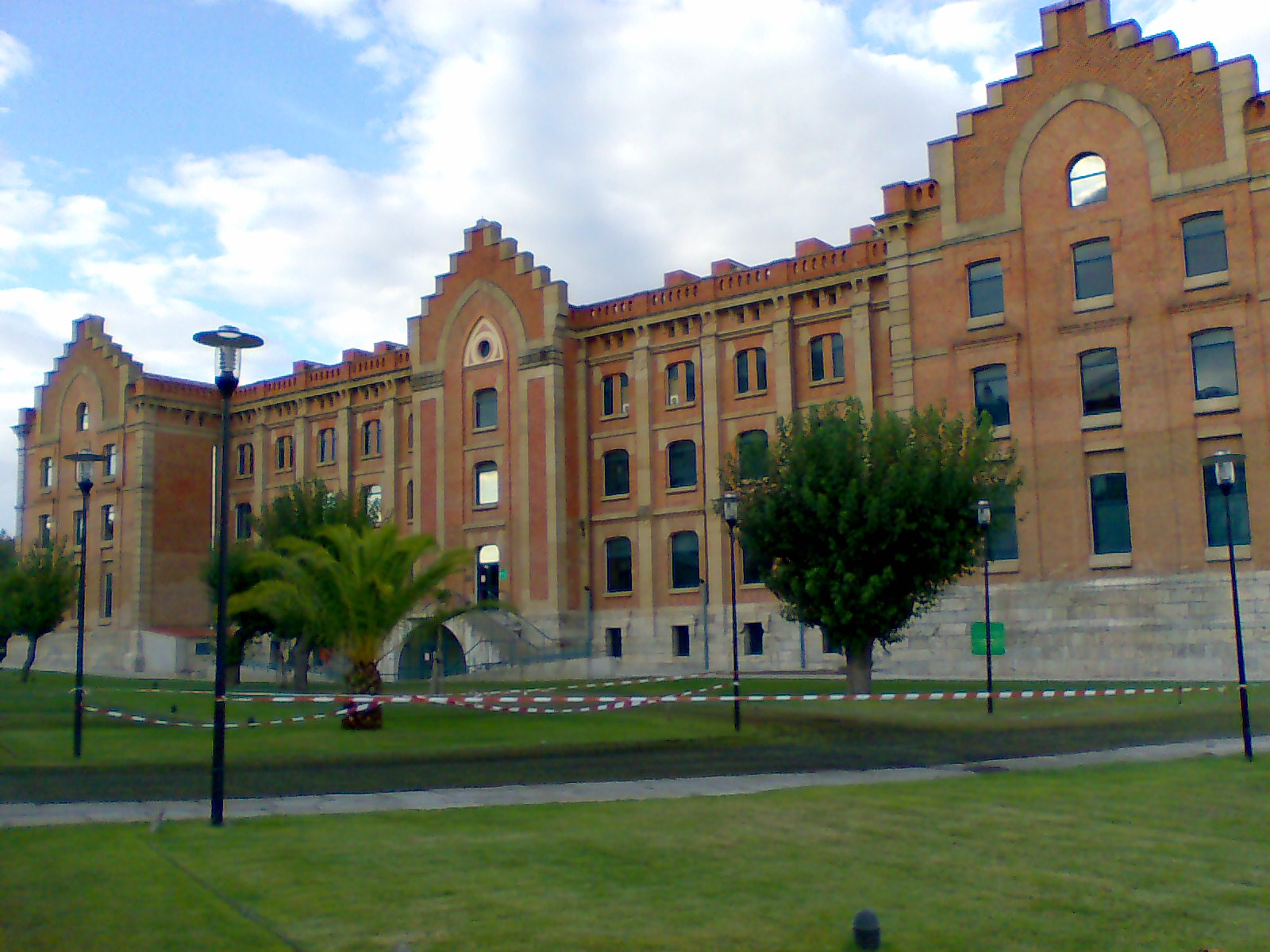
Plasencia Campus

Universities

The main university in the city is the University of Extremadura, with over 1,100 students. The Plasencia Campus, part of this university, offers four degree programs: Nursing, Business Administration and Management, Forestry and Natural Environment Engineering, and Podiatry, the latter two being exclusive to Plasencia within the region. There is also an associated center of the National University of Distance Education, which serves the entire province, including extensions in Cáceres, Coria, Navalmoral de la Mata, and Trujillo. The Catholic University of Ávila is in discussions with the Government of Extremadura to establish a campus in the city, with the former Palace of Justice in the historic center being considered as a potential location.

Schools and institutes

Plasencia is home to numerous educational institutions, including the region's Teachers and Resources Center. The city has eight public early childhood and primary education centers: Alfonso VIII, El Pilar, Escuela Hogar Placentina, Inés de Suárez, La Paz, Miralvalle, San Miguel Arcángel, and Santiago Ramón y Cajal. San Gil and Pradochano have schools integrated into the CRA Valle del Alagón, based in Alagón del Río, which also includes Aldehuela de Jerte.

Additionally, the city has six public secondary education institutes: Gabriel y Galán, Valle del Jerte, Virgen del Puerto, Parque de Monfragüe, Pérez Comendador, and Sierra de Santa Bárbara. These institutes serve students from neighboring municipalities without secondary schools or where education only extends to compulsory secondary education, primarily from Aldehuela de Jerte, Barrado, Cabezabellosa, Cabrero, Casas del Castañar, Carcaboso, El Torno, Holguera, Malpartida de Plasencia, Oliva de Plasencia, Riolobos, Valdeobispo, and Villar de Plasencia.

The municipality also has five state-assisted private schools: La Salle-Guadalupe, Madre Matilde, San Calixto, San José, and Santísima Trinidad. Additionally, the city is home to the public special education center Ponce de León and a center for adult continuing education.

Other centers

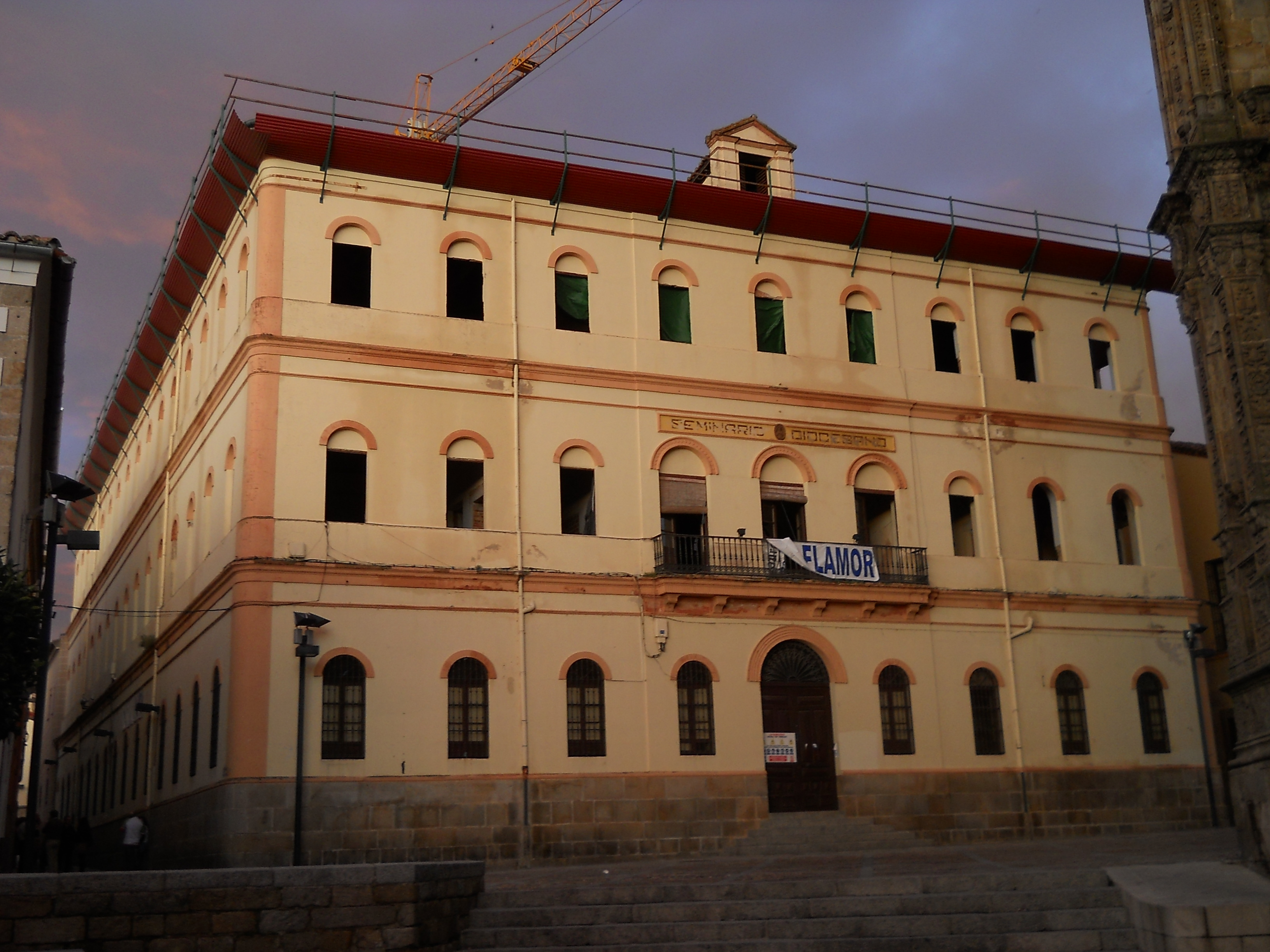
Diocesan seminary

The provincial and municipal administrations manage educational centers in the city. The Provincial Council of Cáceres, through its cultural institution El Brocense, operates the García Matos Conservatory, the Rodrigo Alemán School of Fine Arts, and the dance school at the Santa María cultural complex. The City Council contributes to education with a culinary arts school at Plaza de la Cruz Dorada, accommodating up to 30 students per course, as well as sports schools.

In terms of language education, Plasencia has an Official Language School at Plaza de Santa Ana, offering classes in German, French, English, Italian, and Portuguese, with English available through distance learning. Regarding religious studies, the Diocese of Plasencia maintains major and minor seminaries in the city, with a seminary present since the 17th century. Lastly, Plasencia has a folk high school.

=== Hygiene ===
Waste sorting and street cleaning are managed by the UTE Limpieza Plasencia, established in 2011 and composed of the companies Agroforex, Valoriza, and Ecovias, with its headquarters in the city's industrial estate. While it is the most significant cleaning company, it is not the only one, as other specialized companies handle door-to-door cardboard collection and green space maintenance.

Urban solid waste is collected every night. Deposits are accepted from 9 p.m. to midnight, with collection occurring after midnight. Selective collection of paper, cardboard, and lightweight packaging also occurs, alternating between neighborhoods throughout the city. Large items, such as appliances and furniture, are collected door-to-door every Wednesday. All urban solid waste from the city is processed at a treatment plant in Mirabel.

=== Healthcare ===
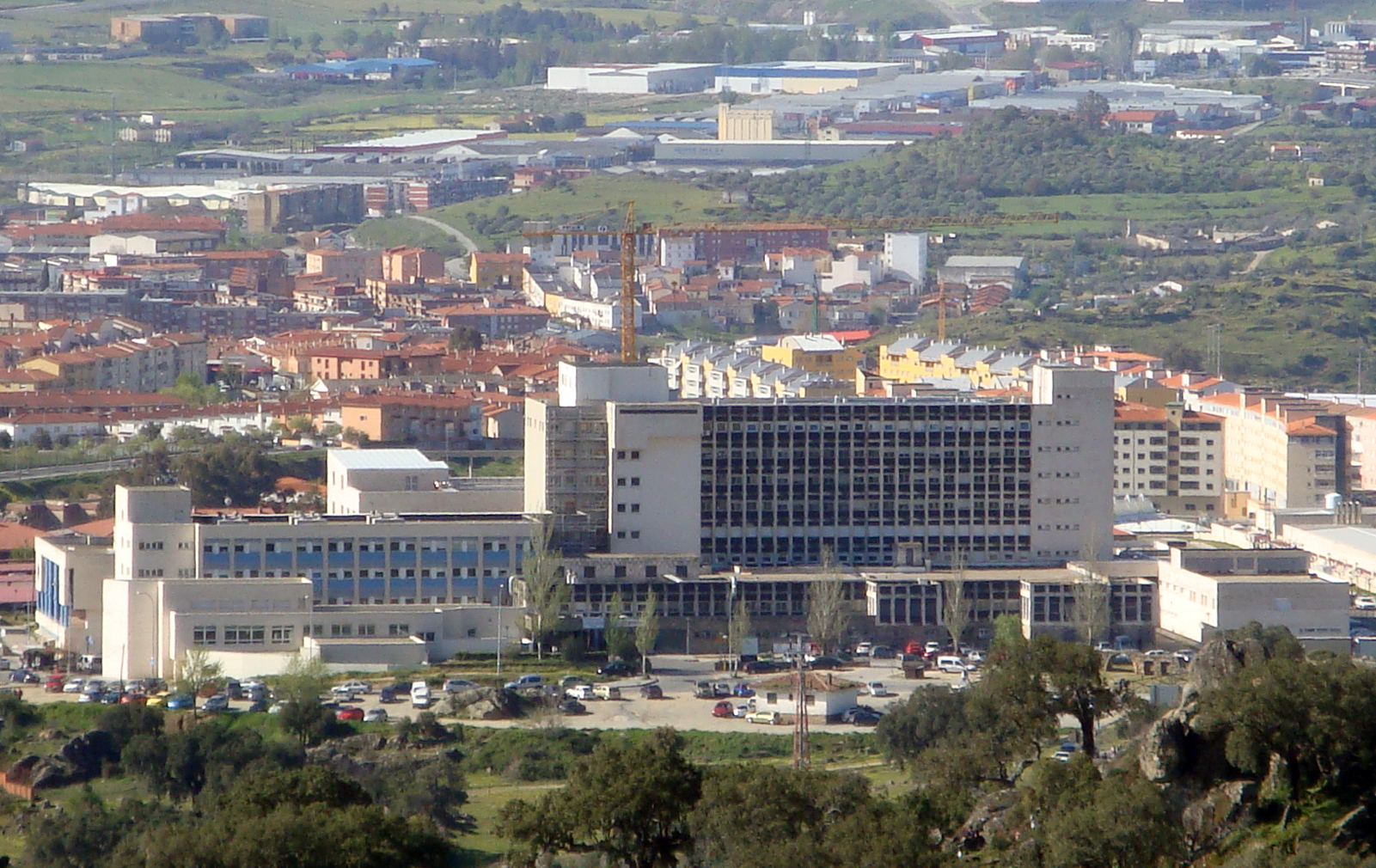
Virgen del Puerto Hospital

Healthcare area capital

Plasencia is the headquarters of one of the eight healthcare areas into which the Extremadura Healthcare Service divides Extremadura. This area comprises fourteen healthcare areas, each with its own health center, providing healthcare to a de facto population of over 125,000 inhabitants. The reference hospital of this healthcare area is the Virgen del Puerto Hospital, located in the Valcorchero area.

Plasencia is home to three of the area's healthcare zones (with a fourth under construction): Plasencia I-Luis de Toro, Plasencia II-San Miguel, and Plasencia III-La Data. The first serves the municipalities of Gargüera and Tejeda de Tiétar; the second serves Malpartida de Plasencia, the Plasencia minor local entities of San Gil and Pradochano, and the six easternmost municipalities of the Vegas del Alagón; the third serves Cabezabellosa, Jarilla, Oliva de Plasencia, and Villar de Plasencia. The other eleven healthcare zones correspond to health centers in Ahigal, Aldeanueva del Camino, Cabezuela del Valle, Casas del Castañar, Hervás, Jaraíz de la Vera, Mohedas de Granadilla, Montehermoso, Nuñomoral, Pinofranqueado, and Serradilla.

Public and private centers

In 2010, in terms of public healthcare, Plasencia had the Virgen del Puerto Hospital, a mental health and addiction treatment hospital, the three aforementioned health centers, a primary care clinic for San Gil, another for Pradochano, a mental health center, and two other specialized centers.

In terms of private healthcare, in 2010, Plasencia had one general hospital, eight medical consultation centers, twelve consultations by other health professionals, twenty-two dental clinics, two recognition centers, one hemodialysis center, three mobile healthcare centers, five centers providing outpatient care, thirteen opticians, two orthopedics, one hearing aid center, nineteen multipurpose centers, and three diagnostic centers.

Pharmacy system

The city has eleven pharmacies, with three serving the Plasencia II-San Miguel healthcare zone and four for each of the other two zones. Each healthcare zone coordinates its on-call pharmacy schedules with those of pharmacies in the city and municipalities within the zone. For the Plasencia II-San Miguel zone, the on-call schedule is also coordinated with the Serradilla healthcare zone.

Residences

Since 2008, Plasencia has operated the Los Pinos Residential Center, which includes an adult daycare center primarily for Alzheimer's patients. The center has 80 beds for Alzheimer's patients and 16 beds for other dependents. In the La Esperanza neighborhood, the Hogar de Nazaret, a Caritas Internationalis project originating in the city with the 1691 convalescent hospital, has been operating since 2007, housing 78 elderly individuals that year. Other elderly residences include the Little Sisters of the Poor residence and the San Francisco residence of the Government of Extremadura.

=== Security ===
Several security forces and bodies operate in the municipality. The city council has its own local police, with its headquarters in La Mazuela. Additionally, Plasencia is the only municipality in the province, aside from the provincial capital, with a local station of the National Police Corps. The municipal security system is completed by the Civil Guard, which has a company in the city under the Cáceres command, coordinating nine posts in the northern part of the province.

Regarding non-police security, the city has firefighters and civil protection. An industrial estate is home to a fire station managed by the Provincial Service for Fire Prevention and Extinction of the Provincial Council of Cáceres. The municipal civil protection board has a permanent service point on Avenida Virgen del Puerto.

== Transport ==
=== Connections ===
Roads

Due to its geographical location, situated halfway between the two Iberian capitals, Madrid and Lisbon, and almost at the midpoint of the most significant communication route that runs through western Spain, the Vía de la Plata, Plasencia has become an important transport hub. Several motorways and roads connect Plasencia with the rest of Spain, some originating in the city itself, and some of the busiest in the region, such as the A-66 motorway passing through Plasencia, the EX-A1, and the road between Plasencia and Malpartida de Plasencia. The roads that pass through Plasencia or have their origin or terminus in the city are listed in the following table:

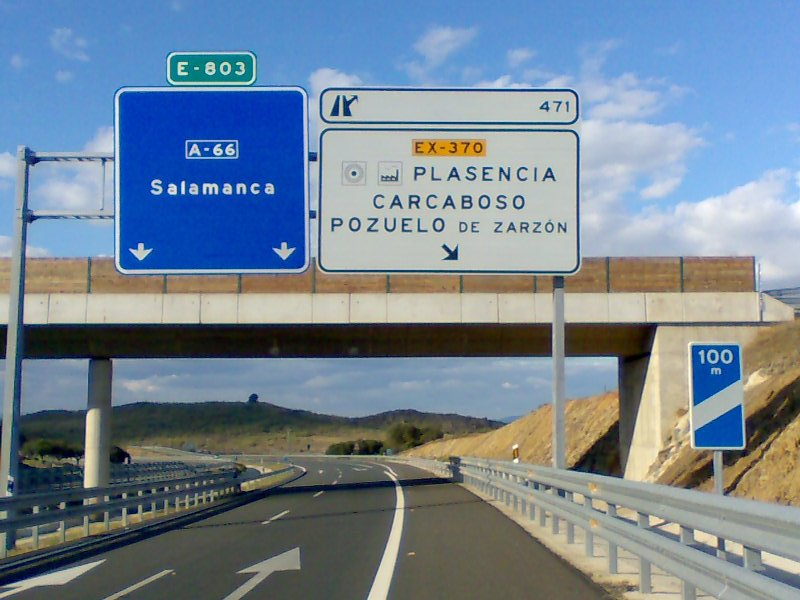
Sign at the entrance to the city from the Autovía A-66

Road map of Plasencia

Designation	Access Point	Destinations
E-803; A-66; Autovía A-66	Crosses the municipal area from north to south, passing west of the city.	North: Villar de Plasencia, Béjar, Salamanca, Zamora, León, and Gijón; South: Cañaveral, Cáceres, Mérida, Almendralejo, Zafra, and Seville.
EX-A1; A1 motorway (Extremadura)	Crosses the municipal area from east to west, passing south of Plasencia and north of San Gil.	East: Malpartida de Plasencia, Casatejada, and Navalmoral de la Mata; West: Galisteo, Coria, Moraleja, and Portugal.
N-630; Avenida Martín Palomino; Avenida de España; Avenida Calvo Sotelo; Avenida Alfonso VIII; Avenida José Antonio; Avenida de Salamanca	Runs through the city center from north to south, with a bypass to the west connecting the industrial estate to the motorway.	Service road for the A-66.
N-110; Avenida del Valle	Intersects with the N-630 at the Puerta de Talavera.	Northeast: Valle del Jerte and Ávila Province.
EX-108; Navalmoral de la Mata to Portugal via Moraleja	Parallel to the EX-A1, passing through the urban area of San Gil.	Service road for the EX-A1.
EX-203; Avenida de la Vera	Intersects with the N-630 at the Puerta del Sol.	East: La Vera and Tiétar Valley.
EX-208; Trujillo Road	Roundabout where Avenida de España and Avenida Martín Palomino diverge.	Southeast: Monfragüe, Trujillo, and Zorita.
EX-304; Plasencia Southern Bypass	Runs along the southeast of the city.	Interurban access between the EX-A1 and the intersection of the N-110 with the EX-203.
EX-370; Avenida Obispo Laso	Intersects with the urban N-630 at Avenida de España.	West: Carcaboso, Montehermoso, and Pozuelo de Zarzón.
CC-36; Malpartida Road	Intersects with the N-630 at the Puerta de Trujillo.	Southeast: Malpartida de Plasencia.

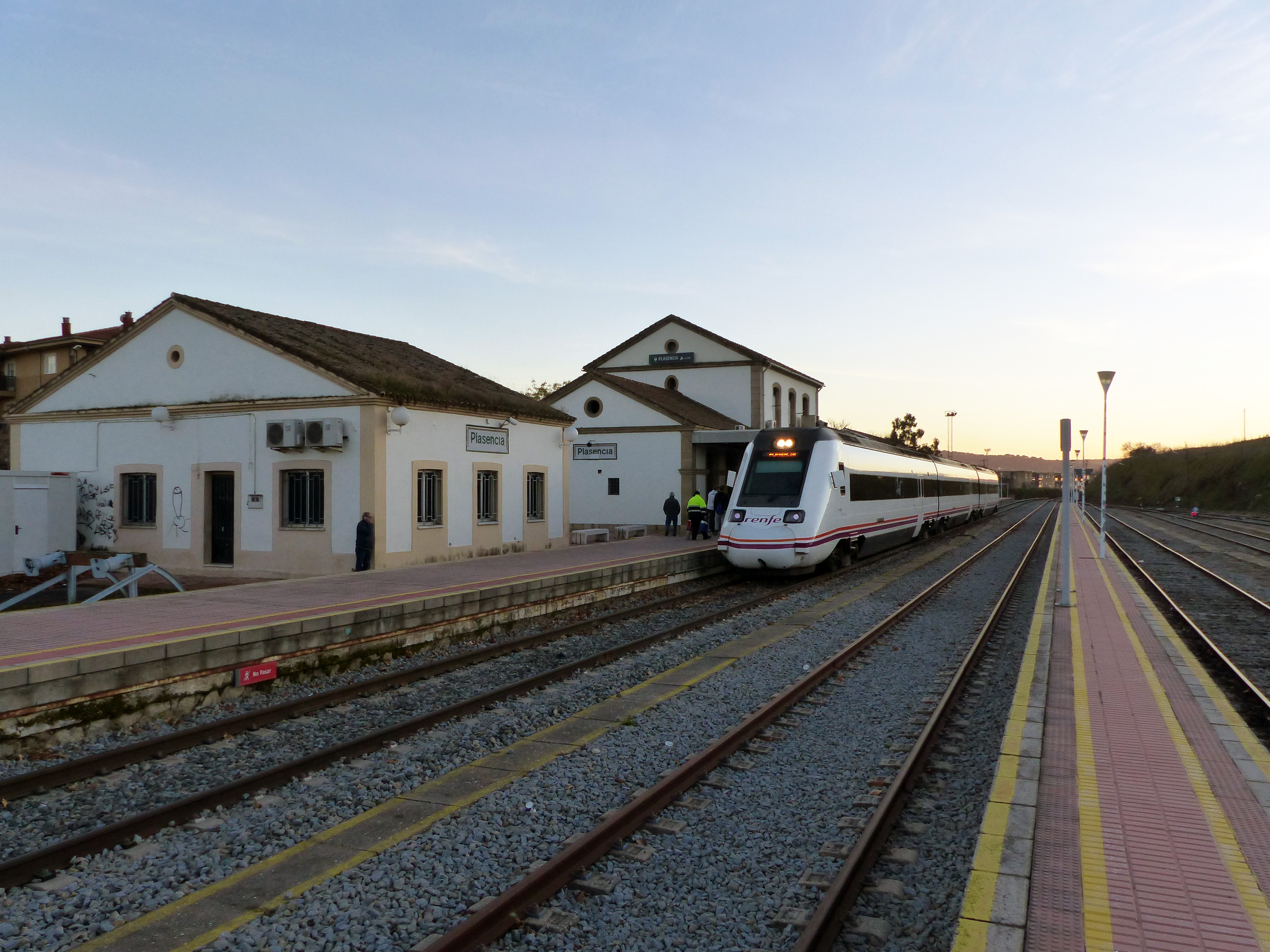
Plasencia railway station

Railway

Plasencia has a train station located on Avenida del Ambroz, offering daily direct connections to cities such as Madrid, Talavera de la Reina, Cáceres, Mérida, Badajoz, and Huelva, operated by Renfe Operadora with Intercity and Regional Exprés trains. Until 1985, the line connecting to Astorga was in service, passing through Salamanca and Zamora.

A high-speed rail line connecting Plasencia with Badajoz is under construction, with a station planned for the city, expected to be completed in 2020.

Intercity bus

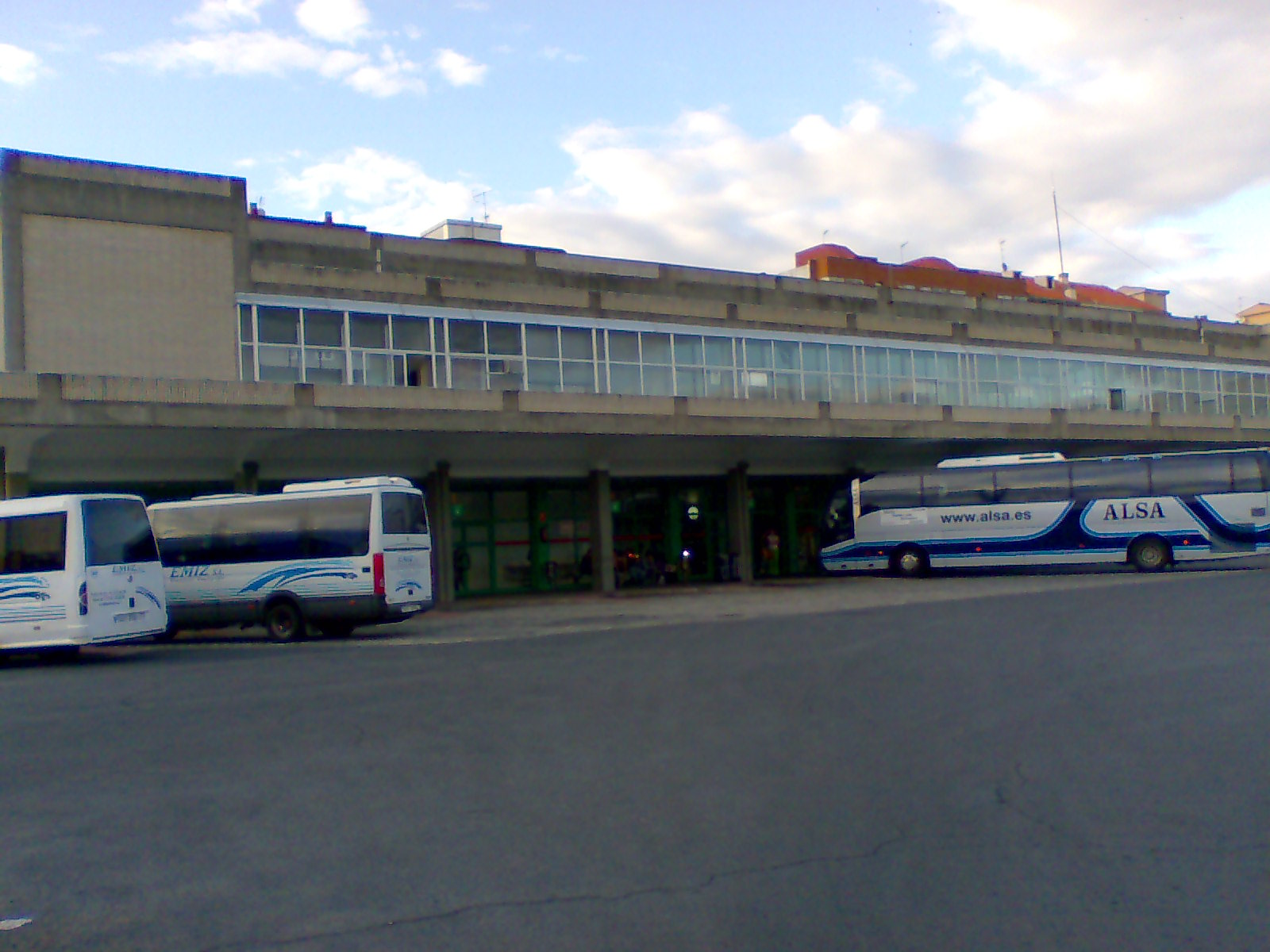
Bus station

The bus station is located on Calle Tornavacas, providing regular connections between Plasencia and other Spanish cities, as well as nearby towns.

Within the Province of Cáceres, Mirat operates several lines connecting Plasencia with various municipalities in the northern half of the province and even with Madrid, passing through Alcorcón and Móstoles. CEVESA connects Plasencia with Cáceres, Ávila, and Madrid via the Valle del Jerte. Another company, ALSA, provides long-distance services to major cities in Andalusia, Castile and León, Galicia, Asturias, Cantabria, and the Basque Country.

=== Urban transport ===
Private vehicles

In 2012, the city had a vehicle fleet of 30,223 motor vehicles, including 21,221 passenger cars, 4,975 trucks and vans, and 4,007 other types of vehicles. Next to the N-630 road, there is a vehicle inspection station operated by the Department of Development of the Government of Extremadura.

Urban bus

Plasencia has had an urban bus service since the 1970s and currently operates three lines. These lines share some common points. Lines 1 and 2 share six stops between the health center and the Puerta de Trujillo. Lines 1 and 3 share six stops between Avenida de España and the Puerta de Talavera, and four more between Alamitos and Los Pinos. Lines 2 and 3 share five stops in the northernmost part of the city and eight more between the railway station and the surroundings of the old town. The only four stops where all three lines converge are on Avenida de España and Avenida Calvo Sotelo. Since 19 August 2013, the routes of the three lines have been as follows:

Line	Route	Description	Frequency	Number of Stops	Urban bus of Line 2
	Industrial Estate - Gabriel y Galán Neighborhood	Connects the industrial estate with the northeastern neighborhoods, passing through the university campus.	15 minutes	32	Urban bus of Line 2
	San Miguel Neighborhood - Virgen del Puerto Hospital	Connects the railway station with the hospital, circling the old town and passing through the sports complex.	20 minutes	29	Urban bus of Line 2
	Los Monjes Neighborhood - Virgen del Puerto Hospital	Connects the Trujillo road with the hospital, passing through the railway and bus stations.	20 minutes	38	Urban bus of Line 2

San Gil and Pradochano are connected to the municipal capital by intercity bus lines operated by Mirat, with one round-trip line passing through each hamlet every weekday.

Taxi

Plasencia has fixed taxi stands at Plaza Mayor, Puerta del Sol, Avenida de la Salle, and Calle Tornavacas. Additionally, there is a specific service for people with reduced mobility.

== Sport ==
=== Teams, clubs, and associations ===
Three football teams from the city competed in the Tercera División during the 2013–2014 season: Ciudad de Plasencia, Unión Polideportiva Plasencia, and CD Ciconia Negra in the Preferente division, with its reserve team in the First Regional division and a women's team in the Extremadura First Division Group 1. Additionally, the city has a veterans' association, a 7-a-side football association for those over 35, and the Rosal de Ayala Football School.

In terms of basketball, Plasencia is represented by CB Plasencia Ambroz and Club Baloncesto Nardeiros Plasencia. In women's basketball, Hierros Díaz Plasencia competes in the LF2 league. In handball, the city has Club Balonmano Plasencia and Club Balonmano Mayorga, the latter named in honor of the renowned Abuelo Mayorga. For hunting and fishing, the city is home to the Plasencia Local Hunters' Society, the Virgen del Puerto Fishermen's Society, and the Plasencia Fishermen's Union. In aquatic sports, there are the Gredos Diving Sports Association, the Plasencia Swimming Club, the Plasencia 96 Sports Association, the Plasencia Canoeing School, the Plasencia Kayak-Polo Club, and the Gabriel y Galán Lake Nautical Club.

In cycling, the city is home to the Plasencia Cycling Sports Association, the Ex–Aequo Cycling Club, and the Integral Bike MTB Club. In motorsports, there are the Ruta de la Plata Motor Club Association, the Plebeyos Motorcyclists Club, and the Plasencia Motorcycle Club. Mountain sports are represented by the Valcorchero Sports Club – Mountain Section and the Plasencia Mountain Group.

Other sports clubs and associations in Plasencia include:

- El Bordón Sports Association, for hiking
- La Espuela Equestrian Association
- Capla Multidisciplinary Sports Association
- Plasencia Handball Club
- Plasencia Billiard Club
- Plasencia Calva Club
- Mayorga Fencing Club
- Ntra. Sra. del Puerto Basque Pelota Club
- Plasencia Archery Club
- Plasencia Shooting Club
- CP San José Sports Club
- Los Cachalotes Disabled Sports Club
- Vía de la Plata Orienteering Sports Club
- Dojo Sports Club
- Heracle Sports Club
- La Data Sports Club
- La Salle Sports Club
- Monfragüe Park Sports Club
- Athletics School Club
- Plasencia Chess Club
- Miralvalle Sports Club
- San Miguel Sports Club
- Plasencia Tennis Sports Club
- EUEXIA Multidisciplinary Sports Association
- Plasencia Motorsport Team
- Fanatik Snowboard Club
- Valdeamor Free Flight Club

=== Sports facilities ===
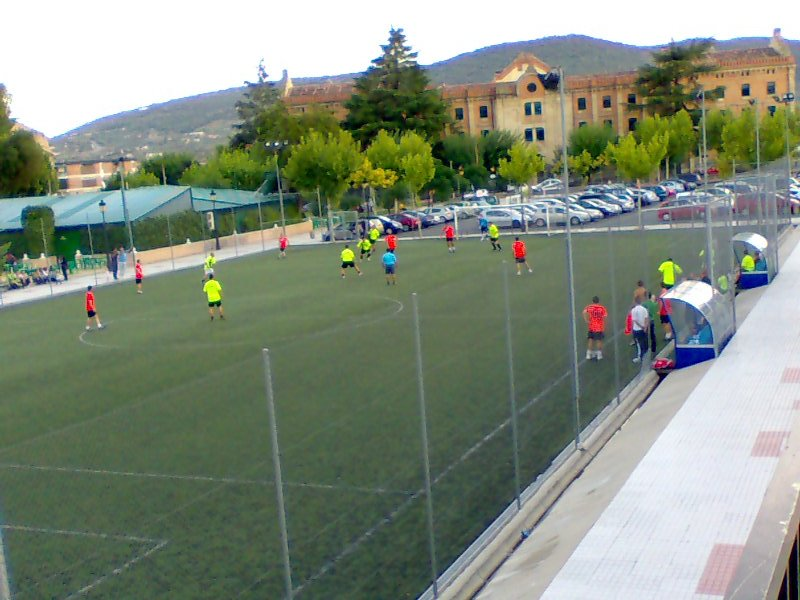
La Coronación Football Field

Plasencia has the following municipal sports facilities:

- Municipal Sports Complex, which offers rentable tennis, paddle tennis, and fronton courts, as well as weight rooms, and facilities for basketball, handball, football, futsal, 7-a-side football, skating, volleyball, swimming, BMX, athletics, table tennis, and climbing;
- Plasencia City Pavilion, featuring a multi-purpose court;
- Indoor swimming pool;
- Outdoor municipal swimming pool, available in the summer.

The city also has private facilities, such as those of the Plasencia City Sports and Social Club, located on the N-110.

In addition to these general facilities, various neighborhoods have other sports facilities:

- Multi-sport courts in La Esperanza, La Data, El Pilar, Miralvalle, and Guadalupe Neighborhood
- Semi-covered multi-sport courts in La Data and Río Jerte]
- San Miguel multi-sport pavilion
- Full-size football fields in La Esperanza and La Isla
- Dirt full-size football field in San Miguel
- Artificial turf football fields in La Coronación and Los Pitufos
- Dirt 7-a-side football fields in La Data, La Serrana, and La Coronación
- Paddle tennis courts behind Los Múltiples and in San Miguel
- Calva court in La Coronación
- Pétanque court in La Isla

== Media ==
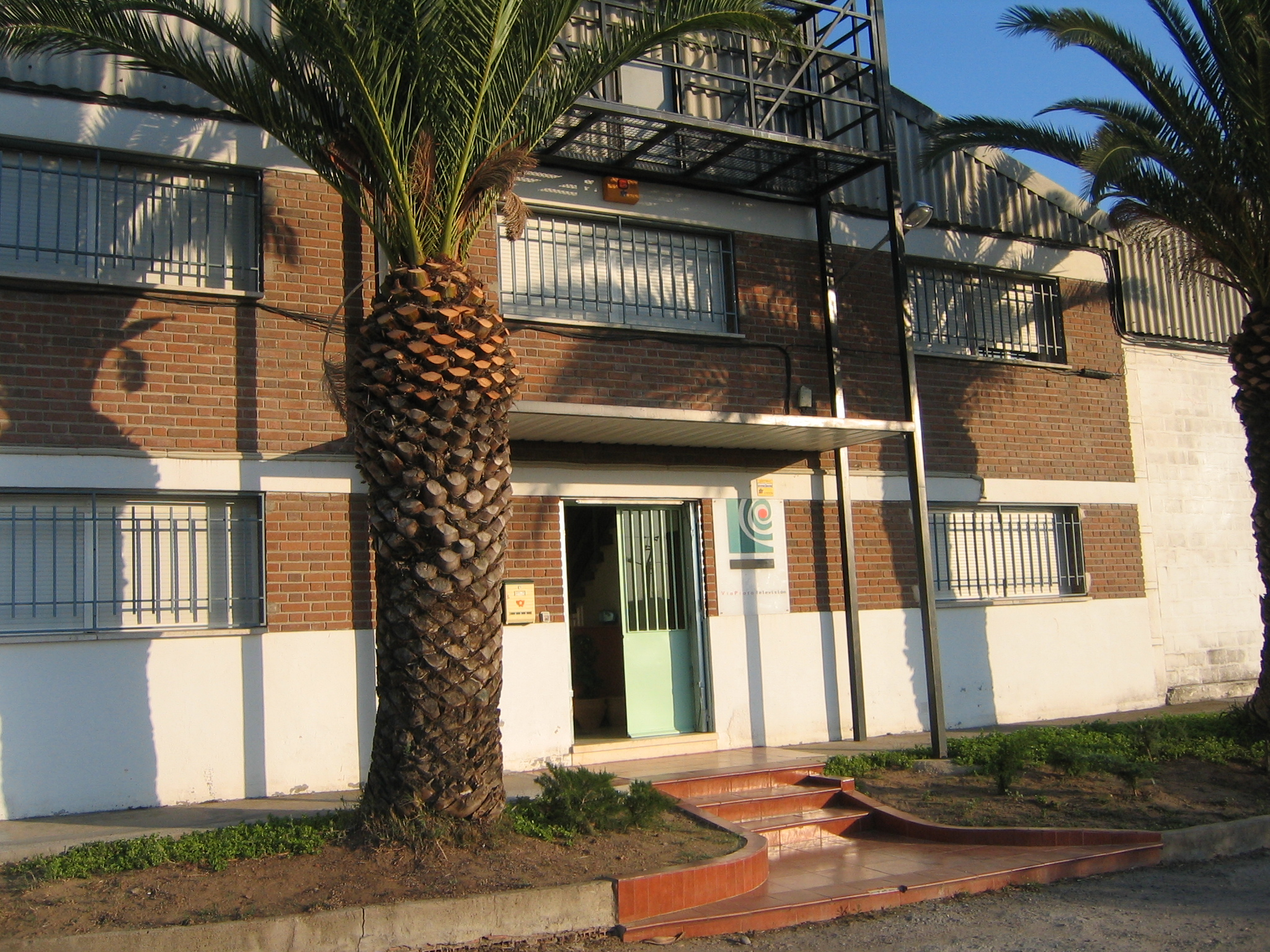
Headquarters of Vía Plata TV in Plasencia

Print Media

Hoy and El Periódico Extremadura have correspondents in the city and each maintains a dedicated Plasencia page in their digital editions. Additionally, local online newspapers include Plasencia Digital and the website of Vía Plata TV.

Radio

The following radio stations broadcast from the city:

- Onda Cero: 87.6 FM
- RNE 1: 88.6 FM
- Cadena SER: 91.4 FM
- Los 40 Principales: 92.3 FM
- RNE 3: 93.3 FM
- Onda Paz: 94.1 FM
- Kiss FM: 96.8 FM
- Canal Norte esRadio: 97.4 FM
- COPE: 98.0 FM
- Radio Clásica: 99.0 FM
- Cadena 100: 101.2 FM
- Canal Extremadura Radio: 102.0 FM
- Cadena 100: 103.2 FM
- RNE 5: 104.4 FM
- Radio María: 105.0 FM

Television

The city has its own satellite stations. However, Pradochano receives the signal from Hervás, and San Gil receives the signal from Gata. Plasencia is the seat of one of the eight local television demarcations in the province, with its direct scope extending to Malpartida de Plasencia. Local DTT licenses in this demarcation were awarded in April 2010 to Teleplasencia, Producción Canal 30 Cáceres, and Radio Vegas Altas.

== International relations ==
=== Twin towns – sister cities ===
The city of Plasencia participates in the twin towns initiative promoted, among other institutions, by the European Union. This initiative aims to establish ties with other municipalities through cultural events, exchanges, or sports activities. Plasencia is twinned with the following cities:

- Talavera de la Reina, Spain (1248)
- Escalona, Spain (1248)
- San Miguel de Abona, Spain (1998)
- Piacenza, Italy (2005)
- Santiago, Chile (2007)

== See also ==
- Diocese of Plasencia
- List of municipalities in Cáceres

== Bibliography ==
- Cadiñanos Bardeci, Inocencio (1985). "The Reconstruction of the Plasencia Town Hall and Jail" (PDF). Norba-arte (6): 159–174. ISSN 0213-2214.
- Calle Calle, Francisco Vicente (2009). Plasencia: "Misterios" en las Catedrales [Plasencia: "Mysteries" in the Cathedrals].
- Colmeiro Penido, Manuel (1883). Cortes de los antiguos reinos de León y de Castilla [Courts of the Ancient Kingdoms of León and Castile]. Order of the Royal Academy of History, Miguel de Cervantes Virtual Library.
- Chaves Palacios, Julián (2001). "The Poet Luis Chamizo and His Era" (PDF). Norba. Revista de historia (15): 217–226. ISSN 0213-375X.
- Diago Hernando, Máximo (2006). "Noble Faction Struggles as a Determining Factor in the Comunero Conflict in Plasencia (1520–1522)" (PDF). Cuadernos de historia moderna (31): 63–89. ISSN 0214-4018.
- Flores del Manzano, Fernando (2008). La Guerra de la Independencia en Plasencia y su tierra [The War of Independence in Plasencia and Its Region]. Badajoz: Caja de Extremadura, Social Work. OCLC 433819995.
- Flores del Manzano, Fernando (2007). Plasencia y su comarca: historia y sociedad (1840–1902), reinado de Isabel II, sexenio revolucionario, restauración [Plasencia and Its Region: History and Society (1840–1902), Reign of Isabel II, Revolutionary Sexennium, Restoration]. Brenes: Múñoz Moya Editores Extremeños. OCLC 245604592.
- Flores del Manzano, Fernando (2004). Plasencia y su entorno durante el reinado de Fernando VII y la regencia de María Cristina (1808–1840) [Plasencia and Its Surroundings During the Reign of Fernando VII and the Regency of María Cristina (1808–1840)]. Plasencia City Council (Cáceres). OCLC 433414565.
- Fortaleza del Rey, Miguel (1986). Caracterización agroclimática de la provincia de Cáceres [Agroclimatic Characterization of the Province of Cáceres]. Madrid: General Directorate of Agricultural Production. OCLC 629102740.
- Linares Luján, Antonio Miguel (1991). El Mercado Franco de Plasencia [The Free Market of Plasencia]. Cáceres: Official Chamber of Commerce and Industry. ISBN 84-87600-11-5. Archived from the original on July 14, 2013.
- Lora Serrano, Gloria (1999). "The Process of Seigneurialization of the Land of Plasencia (1252–1312)". Miscelánea medieval murciana (23–24): 51–73. ISSN 0210-4903. Archived from the original on March 8, 2014.
- López Monteagudo, Guadalupe (1979). "Considerations on Boquique Ceramics" (PDF). Archivo español de arqueología (139–140): 21–26. ISSN 1988-3110.
- Luis López, Carmelo (2002). "The Southern Regions of the Medieval Land of Ávila: Clarifications on a Problematic Delimitation and Repopulation" (PDF). Studia histórica. Historia medieval (20–21): 11–45. ISSN 0213-2060.
- Martínez Díez, Gonzalo (1983). "Extremadura: Origin of the Name and Formation of the Two Provinces" (PDF). Anuario de la Facultad de Derecho (2): 59–119. ISSN 0213-988X.
- Martínez Martínez, Julio Gerardo (1993). "Plasencia and Its Charter in the Context of Castilian Extremadura" (PDF). Anuario de la Facultad de Derecho (11): 321–334. ISSN 0213-988X.
- de la Montaña Conchiña, Juan Luis; Clemente Ramos, Julián (1994). "Christian Extremadura (1142–1230): Spatial Occupation and Socioeconomic Transformations" (PDF). Historia, Instituciones, Documentos (21): 83–124. ISSN 0210-7716.
- Morales, Ernesto (2006). Exploradores y piratas en la América del Sur [Explorers and Pirates in South America]. Renacimiento. ISBN 9788484726906.
- Ohara, Shima (2004). Tesis doctoral: La propaganda política en torno al conflicto sucesorio de Enrique IV (1457–1474) [Doctoral dissertation: Political Propaganda Surrounding the Succession Conflict of Enrique IV (1457–1474)]. Alicante: Miguel de Cervantes Virtual Library. ISBN 84-688-7203-2.
- Riesco Roche, Sergio (2006). "The Progressive Privatization of Communal Lands in Northern Extremadura (1790–1843)" (PDF). Alcántara: Journal of the Cáceres Studies Seminar (65): 93–112. ISSN 0210-9859. Archived from the original (PDF) on March 28, 2014.
- Sánchez Alzás, Carlos J. (2004). "The French Presence in Plasencia During the War of Independence (1808–1812)" (PDF). Alcántara: Journal of the Cáceres Studies Seminar (59–60): 25–44. ISSN 0210-9859.
- Sánchez Bueno, Luis Carlos (1988). "The City of Plasencia at the End of the Old Regime (Demography, Economy, and Society)" (PDF). Alcántara: Journal of the Cáceres Studies Seminar (15): 57–74. ISSN 0210-9859.
- Sánchez de la Calle, José Antonio (1993). Plasencia, la perla del valle del Jerte [Plasencia, the Pearl of the Jerte Valley]. Mérida: Regional Publisher of Extremadura. ISBN 84-7671-993-0.
- Sánchez de la Calle, José Antonio (2009). "History of Education in Plasencia from the Second Half of the 19th Century to the Mid-20th Century" (PDF). Coloquios Históricos de Extremadura (2): 761–798. ISBN 978-84-692-4898-0.
- Soria Mesa, Enrique (2008). Farsa de Ávila: los nobles contra el rey de Castilla [Farce of Ávila: The Nobles Against the King of Castile]. Plasencia City Council (Cáceres).
- Tirado García, Laura (2006). "The Alcázar of Plasencia: History and Destruction" (PDF). Norba-Arte (XXVI): 167–175. ISSN 0213-2214.
- Vicente Calle, Cándido Rafael; Cabezas Fernández, José; Escudero García, José Carlos (2008). Estudio termométrico de la Provincia de Cáceres [Thermometric Study of the Province of Cáceres]. Cáceres: University of Extremadura. OCLC 630206676.
