= Trasierra/Tierras de Granadilla =

Trasierra/Tierras de Granadilla Transierra - Granaílla
- Comarca
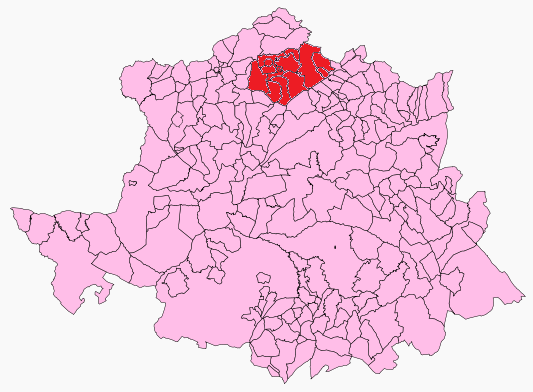
- Location in the province of Cáceres.
- Country: Spain
- Autonomous community: Extremadura
- Province: Cáceres
- Municipalities: List: Abadía, Ahigal, Azabal, El Bronco, Casar de Palomero, Cerezo, La Granja, Guijo de Granadilla, Marchagaz, Mohedas de Granadilla, Palomero, Pedro-Muñoz, La Pesga, Rivera Oveja, Santa Cruz de Paniagua, Santibáñez el Bajo, Zarza de Granadilla

Area
  - Total: 614.69 km^{2} (237.33 sq mi)

Population
  - Total: 10,298
  - Density: 16.753/km^{2} (43.390/sq mi)
- Time zone: UTC+1 (CET)
  - Summer (DST): UTC+2 (CEST)
- Largest municipality: Zarza de Granadilla

Trasierra/Tierras de Granadilla (Extremaduran: Transierra - Granaílla), traditionally known as Tierras de Granadilla, is a comarca at the northern end of province of Cáceres in Extremadura, one of Spain's seventeen Autonomous Communities.

Its origins as an administrative unit date back to the establishment of the House of Alba in the 15th century. Its historical capital was the town of Granadilla, now abandoned. Until 1833 the Tierras de Granadilla historical region the five towns of las Hurdes, the villages of La Alberca and Sotoserrano (now in Salamanca Province, Castile and León), as well as the western part of Aldeanueva del Camino, which is now part of the Valle de Ambroz comarca to the east. The southern limit of Tierras de Granadilla is marked by the ancient commercial path known as "Via de la Plata", which is known locally as "lindón".

There are linguistic affinities between this comarca and neighboring Las Hurdes and Sierra de Gata comarcas.

The Mancomunidad Integral de Trasierra-Tierras de Granadilla was formed in 1997. The Mancomunidad includes villages that were not part of the historical region, like Oliva de Plasencia, Jarilla and Cabezabellosa. Casar de Palomero town was merged with the Mancomunidad de las Hurdes.

== Municipalities ==
The traditional names of the towns and aldeas are in brackets.

- Abadía
- Ahigal (L'Ahigal)
- Azabal (L'Azabal)
- El Bronco (El Broncu)
- Casar de Palomero (El Casal de Palomeru)
- Cerezo (Cerezu)
- Granadilla (Granaílla), now uninhabited.
- La Granja
- Guijo de Granadilla (El Guiju)
- Marchagaz
- Mohedas de Granadilla (Las Muedas)
- Palomero (Palomeru)
- Pedro-Muñoz (Peroti)
- La Pesga (La Peja)
- Rivera Oveja
- Santa Cruz de Paniagua (Santa Cruz de las Cebollas)
- Santibáñez el Bajo (Santibañis)
- Zarza de Granadilla (La Zarza)
