= Cerezo (disambiguation) =

Cerezo is a municipality in the province of Cáceres, Spain.

Cerezo may also refer to:

== People ==
- Adela Cerezo Bautista (b. 1962), Mexican politician
- Cerezo Haabo (b. 1994), Surinamese footballer
- Cerezo Hilgen (b. 1994), Dutch footballer
- Benny Frankie Cerezo (1943–2013), Puerto Rican politician
- Carmen Consuelo Cerezo (b. 1940), Puerto Rican judge
- Efrén Cerezo Torres (b. 1946), Mexican politician
- Enrique Cerezo (b. 1948), Spanish film producer and current president of Atlético de Madrid
- Francisco Cerezo (b. 1970), Spanish cyclist
- Gisela Cerezo (b. 1956), Venezuelan swimmer
- José Manuel Cerezo (b. 1973), Spanish runner
- Juan Cerezo de Salamanca, interim Spanish governor of the Philippines (1633–1635)
- Mateo Cerezo (1637–1666), Spanish painter
- Nieves Herrero Cerezo (b. 1957), Spanish journalist
- Pedro Cerezo Galán (b. 1935), Spanish philosopher
- Sebastián Cerezo (fl. 1780), Spanish dancer
- Toninho Cerezo (b. 1955), Brazilian footballer
- Vinicio Cerezo (b. 1942), Guatemalan politician

== Places ==
- Cerezo de Abajo, a municipality in the province of Segovia, Spain
- Cerezo de Arriba, a municipality in the province of Segovia, Spain
- Cerezo de Río Tirón, a municipality in the province of Burgos, Spain

== Other uses ==
- Cerezo Osaka, Japanese football club
