= Ambroz Valley =

Valley in Cáceres, Spain

Coordinates: 40.2739°N 5.8658°W

The Ambroz Valley (Spanish: Valle del Ambroz, Extremaduran: Valli d’Ambrós) is a valley in the north of the Spanish province of Cáceres. It takes its name from the river that runs through it. Surrounded by mountains, the largest peak is Pinajarro. Silver Way through the valley since Roman times and made it a passage and an important communication route between the north and south of the Iberian Peninsula.

The capital of Ambroz valley is a town called Hervás, which is known for its old Jewish quarter. Others towns which are part of the valley are Baños de Montemayor (where there are Roman thermal baths), Aldeanueva del Camino, Gargantilla, Segura de Toro (where Celtic vestiges remain), Casas del Monte, Abadía and La Granja. Through this valley passed many peoples throughout ages: Celts, Romans, Muslims, Jews and Napoleon's army.

The manufacturing of handcrafted furniture is one of the most important activities. Tourism is also very developed. Chestnut woods in autumn is a popular spectacle. At this season, it is celebrate el otoño mágico (Autumn Magic), a festival that takes place throughout the month of November and during which produces popular activities, folklore and cultural of any type.

In 2024, a program was launched to pay remote workers to work in the valley to try to offset population decline.
