= Zarza de Granadilla =

Municipality in Extremadura, Spain

Coordinates: 40°14′N 6°03′W

Zarza de Granadilla, Spain
- municipality
- Flag Coat of arms
- Interactive map of Zarza de Granadilla, Spain
- Country: Spain
- Autonomous community: Extremadura
- Province: Cáceres
- Municipality: Zarza de Granadilla

Area
  - Total: 134 km^{2} (52 sq mi)
- Elevation: 399 m (1,309 ft)

Population (2025-01-01)
  - Total: 1,815
  - Density: 13.5/km^{2} (35.1/sq mi)
- Time zone: UTC+1 (CET)
  - Summer (DST): UTC+2 (CEST)

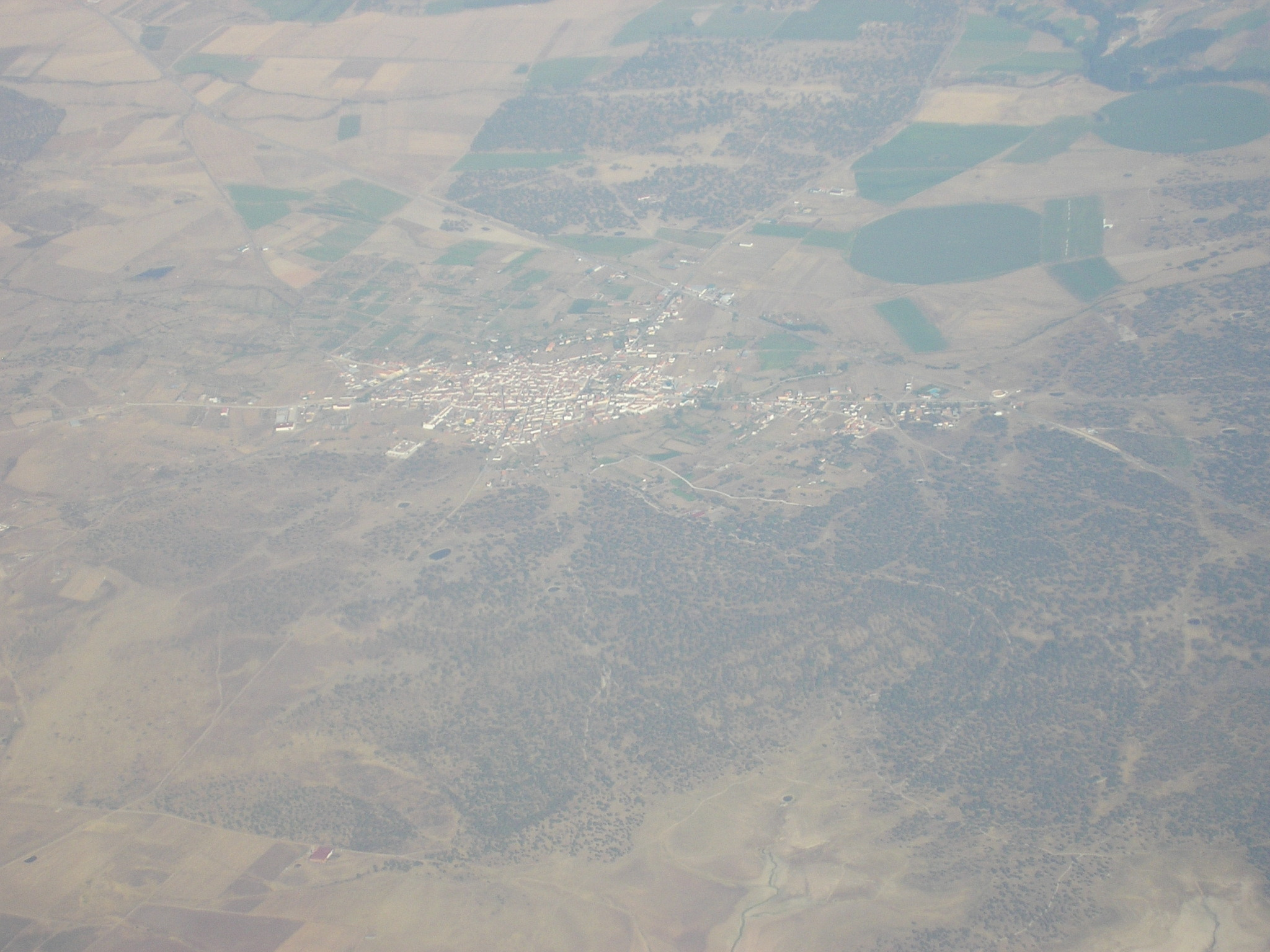
Zarza de Granadilla

Zarza de Granadilla is a Spanish municipality in Cáceres Province, Extremadura. Zarza de Granadilla has a population of 1873.

It is situated at the north of the province of Cáceres, between the valley of the river Ambroz and Alagon. It borders the Extremaduran municipalities of Abadía, La Granja and Casas del Monte to the east; Jarilla, Villar de Plasencia and Guijo de Granadilla to the south; Mohedas de Granadilla, La Pesga and Caminomorisco to the west as well as the Castilian-Leonese municipalities of Sotoserrano and Lagunilla to the north. It has a total area of 134 km2.

== Description ==
Until the mid-20th century, this village was called Lugar de las Zarzas. It was a resting and feeding area for the Cañada Real de las Merinas. Two million sheep a year from the Kingdom of León and Castile used to pass through what is now Calle de la Constitución. Its origins date back to the 16th century, when, due to an epidemic, the Duke of Alba, owner of these lands, authorised the inhabitants of Villoria to settle here. The square and the church of Nuestra Señora de la Asunción, located in the highest part of the town, were built at this time. In its luminous nave, a gilded wooden high altar stands out. The small hermitage of Cristo de la Misericordia, from the 18th century, is also worth a visit. The Gabriel y Galán reservoir reaches right up to the town's doorstep, making it possible to enjoy its beaches, fishing and water sports. Zarza de Granadilla is surrounded by mountains, except to the south, where countless meadows and the fertile plain of the Ambroz spread out. Paprika and traditional sausages (chorizo sausages, pumpkin and potato sausages, cured pork loins, hams...) are part of its gastronomic offer.

=== Granadilla ===
Granadilla: The town of Granadilla lies on a promontory. In 1170 the Villa de Granada was founded by King Leon Don Fernando, which kept its name until the reign of the Catholic Monarchs, when it was renamed Granadilla, until the present day. In 1911 it came under the control of the Order of Santiago and later came under the rule of different lords and kings. In 1446, King Juan II donated the entire Lordship of Granada to Fernando Álvarez de Toledo and it thus belonged to the House of Alba until the 19th century. The town is dominated by the castle of Granadilla, a defensive construction of granite masonry that stands alongside the remains of what was once its imposing Almohad wall. The longueras, enclosed orchards within the walls that were an important resource during the sieges, are reminders of the old urban structure of the town. It was abandoned by its inhabitants when the reservoir was built. Although it is currently being restored, this fortified town can be visited.

== History ==
In the north of the province of Cáceres is the municipality of Zarza de Granadilla, which was founded in the 15th century.

The town was born under the name of La Zarza and was later joined by Granadilla, when the urban centre of the latter was completely abandoned when most of its land was flooded after the construction of the Gabriel y Galán reservoir.

Among the architectural attractions worth visiting in Zarza de Granadilla are the 16th-century church of Nuestra Señora de la Asunción and the 18th-century chapel of Cristo de la Misericordia.

A visit to the municipality should not miss the village of granadilla, which is in the process of being restored and conserves a large part of the Almohad walls and the medieval castle, as well as its parish church.

In the Provincial Museum of Cáceres there are a number of objects of adornment and personal use from the Visigothic period, among which are the classic belt brooches adorned with rhinestones, found in this locality. At the fall of the Ancien Régime, the town became a constitutional municipality in the region of Extremadura, Judicial District of Granadilla, then known as La Zarza.

== Economy ==
Its population lives mainly from agriculture (40%) and livestock (20%). The industrial and construction sectors account for 15% of the population, while the remaining 25% work in the service sector.

Rainfed agricultural production is basically cereals and pasture, with minimal areas of olive groves. As for irrigated agriculture, tobacco and paprika are the main crops.

== Demography ==
In the 1842 census it had 230 households and 1280 inhabitants. In 1965, the municipality's municipal area grew because it incorporated an unflooded part of Granadilla, including the population centre.

In 2020 the population was 1800 persons, 911 men and 889 women.

== Sports ==
The main sports facility in Zarza de Granadilla is the International Centre for Sports Innovation in the Natural Environment, located on the border of the municipalities of Guijo de Granadilla and Zarza de Granadilla, on a peninsula above the Gabriel y Galán reservoir. Characterised by its ring shape, which has given it the nickname of "The Ring", it is a joint project of the Junta de Extremadura and the Consejo Superior de Deportes, a series of specific facilities for the practice, training, research and development of various sports. It was inaugurated in 2011.

In the summer season, the town's municipal swimming pool is a highlight.

== Monuments ==
- Catholic parish church dedicated to Nuestra Señora de la Asunción, which was built in the 15th century
- Hermitage of Cristo de la Misericordia, from the 18th century.
- Despoblado de Granadilla
- Castle of Granadilla

== Festivities ==
- As is traditional, on the first Sunday in May the Romería de la Virgen de Fátima is held, which is different from the Romería that is held two Mondays after Easter Sunday. This pilgrimage takes place between the Argamasa stream and the Horno stream.
- On the first Sunday in July, the procession of San Cristóbal is held, in which local vehicles take part.
- The feast day of the patron saint of the town is San Ramón Nonato, on 31 August.

== Public Services ==
- Education

The village has a rural grouped school, the CRA Ambroz, to which the municipalities of Abadía, Casas del Monte and La Granja belong. For secondary education, there is the IESO Cáparra, where you can study the four years of ESO and the vocational training of Administrative Services Assistant. It is also possible to access the Technological Literacy Plan from the Tele-centre next to the municipal library.

- Health

It belongs to the health area of Aldeanueva del Camino within the health area of Plasencia and has a point of continuous care.

== See also ==
- List of municipalities in Cáceres
