= Ambroz River =

River in Spain

Coordinates: 40.1642°N 6.1556°W

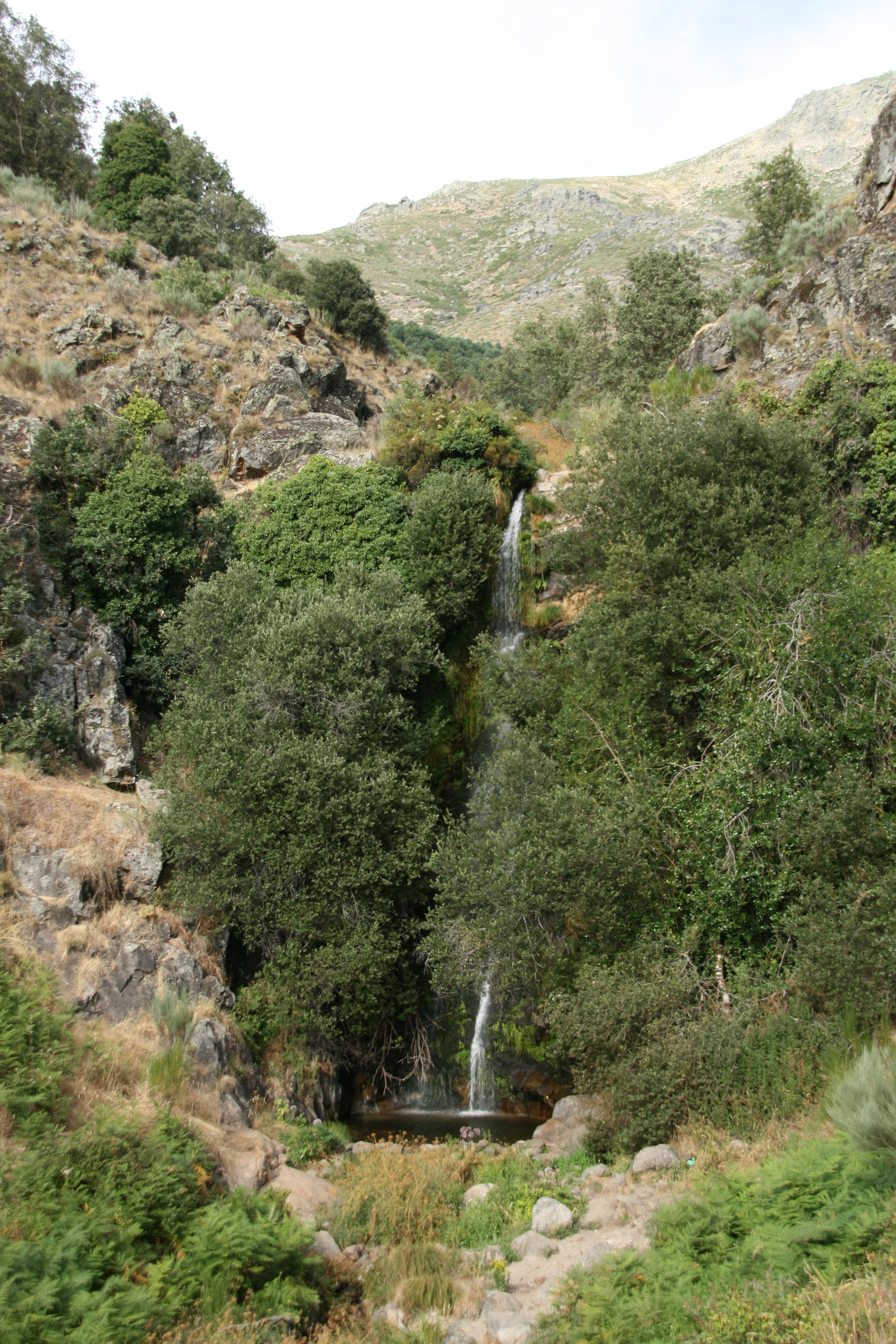
Source of the Ambroz river

The Ambroz is a river for which Valle del Ambroz, an area in Spain north of Extremadura, near the border of Portugal, was named. The area is home to eight villages: Hervás, Baños de Montemayor, Abadía, Casas del Monte, La Garganta, Gargantilla, Aldeanueva del Camino and Segura de Toro. The total population of the area is about 8,000.

The river is popular with tourists. Tourist activities include hiking and mushroom hunting.
