= La Granja, Spain =

La Granja
- Municipality
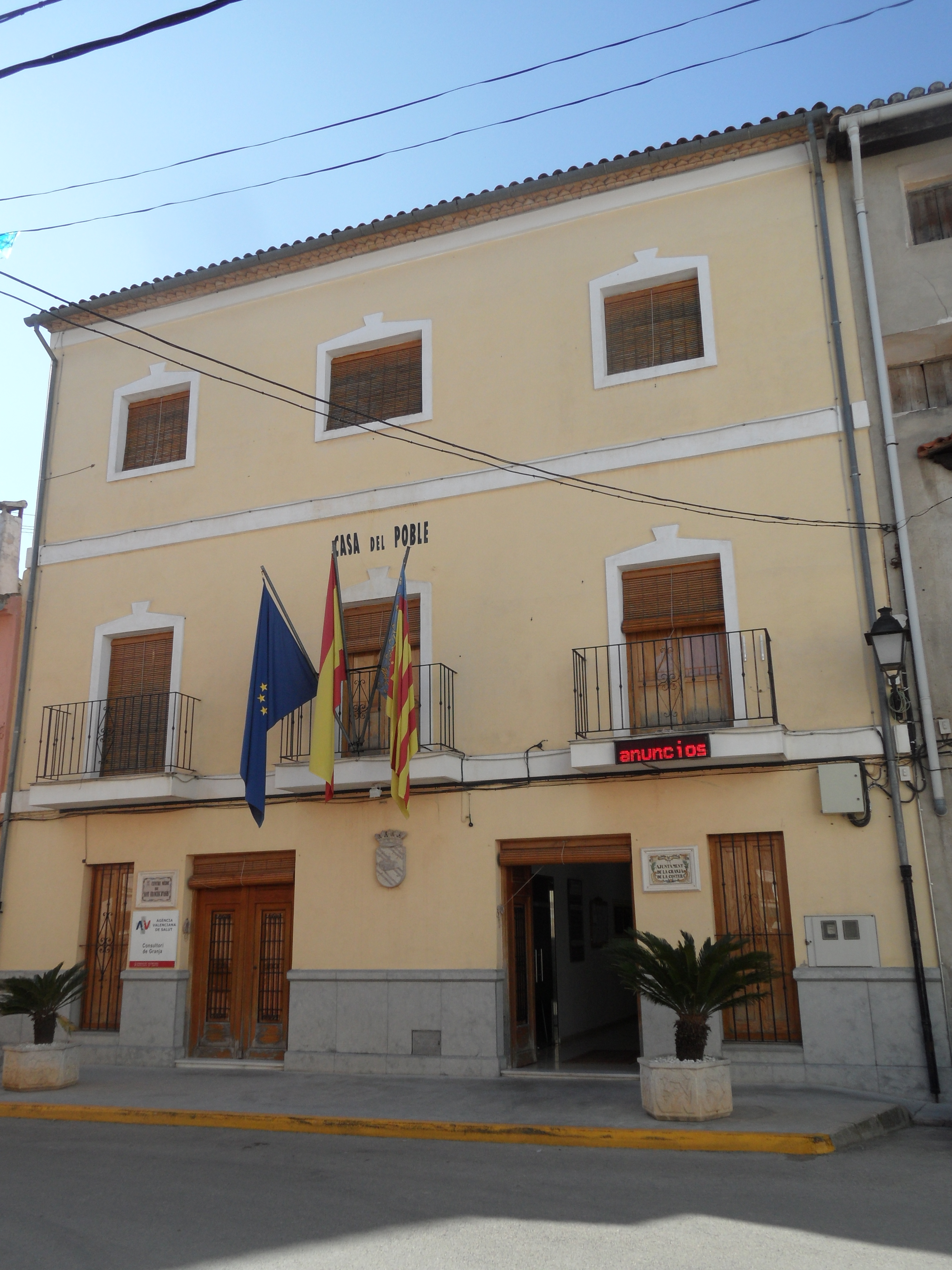
- Town hall

- Flag Coat of arms

- Location in Spain
- Coordinates: 40°14′22″N 5°59′41″W
- Country: Spain
- Autonomous Community: Extremadura
- Province: Cáceres
- Comarca: Ambroz Valley

Government
  - Mayor: Óscar Martín Martin (Socialist Party)

Area
  - Total: 14.94 km^{2} (5.77 sq mi)
- Elevation (AMSL): 410 m (1,350 ft)

Population (2025-01-01)
  - Total: 313
  - Density: 2,403/km^{2} (6,220/sq mi)
- Time zone: UTC+1 (CET)
  - Summer (DST): UTC+2 (CEST (GMT +2))
- Postal code: 10711
- Area code: +34 (Spain) + 927 (Cáceres)
- Website: www.lagranja.es

La Granja or Granja de Granadilla is a municipality in the province of Cáceres and autonomous community of Extremadura, Spain. The municipality covers an area of 14.94 square kilometres (5.77 sq mi. In 2011 it had a population of 364 people. It is located between the shires of Tierras de Granadilla and Ambroz Valley.

== Geography and environment ==
It is situated on Cambrian land, in the valley of Ambroz River and at the foot of the Cruces Altas mountains (Sistema Central). Its surroundings present holm oaks and cork oaks along with other species that are part of scrub, such as rockrose, gorse, and lavender. The Ambroz River flows through the outskirts of the village, creating a great natural pool that makes the town a popular place to visit. In the summer, the village's life revolves around this river.

== History ==
The name La Granja evokes to the concept of a farm. It is probable that it makes reference to its relation with the town of Granadilla first, and to Abadía later. It supposed a base of exploitation and supply for these populations, so related to the duchy of the House of Alba in its settling and exploitation after the called Reconquista. These lands, have been a transit point of so many historical settlements between the Castilian and Extremadurian plateau, and therefore of many warlike skirmishes, preserving signs like the fortresses or traces of their stay.

In the town is located, a Roman milestone, with a Latin inscription that attests to the Roman presence and makes reference with traits of divinity to the Roman emperor in charge at that moment. Even so, the most prominent building in the town is the Catholic church. According to inscriptions on its walls, the construction of the building is oriented to the 16th century, the year 1544 is chiseled in one of the stirrups of the northern part and the year 1597 in the base of the church.

== Economy ==
According to Pascual Madoz, in the year 1847 in his Historical Statistical Geographic Dictionary, in his reference to La Granja, the town produces wheat, rye, barley, chickpeas, flax, oil, many vegetables, especially melons and watermelons. Sheep, goat-like, bovine and porcine cattle were kept. Small game and tench catch in the lagoons were raised and ordinary fish in the river. Regarding Industry and Commerce, it indicates that the town has 3 flour mills, 1 oil mill, 6 linen looms, 1 tile factory and some pepper, cattle and wool are exported.

At present, the economical activity is depressed like other villages of the area. The primary sector occupies 60% of the active population and, as in the whole area, the stockbreeding sector stands out among the others. On the other hand, tourism is also important.

== Transportation ==
It is located on the road EX-205, an important regional road that joins Hervás with Portugal and communicates the main rural areas of the province northwest. The Ruta de la Plata Highway and its secondary road N-630 are only 1 km east from the town, which allows easy access to and from it. In the northern part of the village there is a rural way that leads directly to Abadía.

== Festivities ==
All the local festivities held in the town have a Catholic Christian religious origin and are:

- Saint Sebastian or "Los Mártiles"; celebrated on January 20.
- Carnival; which has a variable date (between February and March depending on the year).
- La Romería (the Pilgrimage); held on the last Saturday of April since the beginning of the 21st century.
- Saint Anthony ″San Antonio″; celebrated on June 13. During the saint's figure procession offerings are made to him, to be auctioned later among the locals.
- Saint Mary Magdalene; It is the most important and celebrated festivity of the village, being the 22nd of July the most important day.
- The Christ of Peace; which takes place on the last Saturday of August.

== See also ==
- List of municipalities in Cáceres
