= Plasencia railway station =

Railway station in Talavera de la Reina, Spain

Plasencia
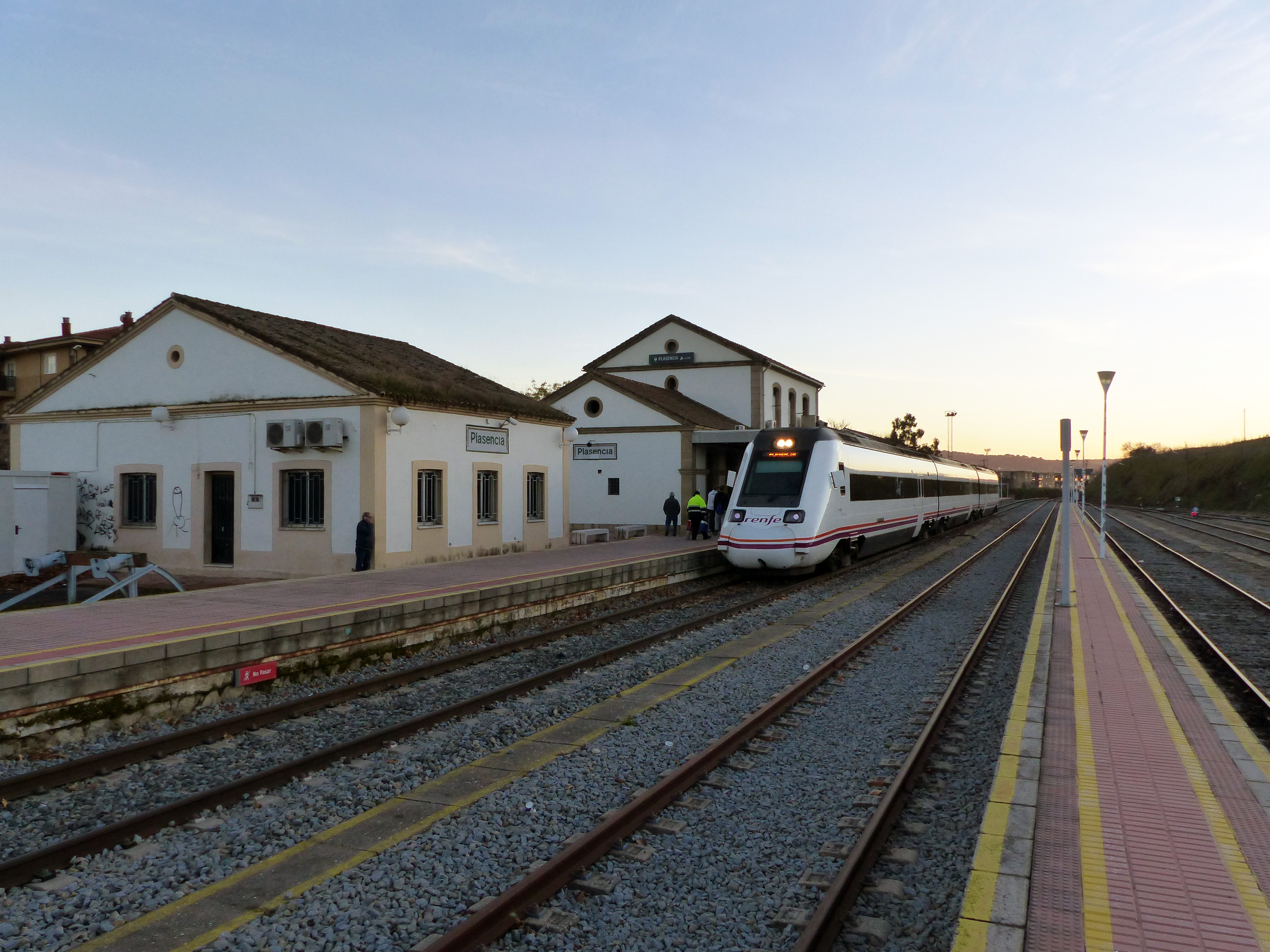

General information
- Location: Calle Alfonso Camargo S/N, Plasencia, Cáceres, 10600
- Coordinates: 40.022278°N 6.099491°W
- Owner: Adif
- Operator: Renfe
- Line: Line 52
- Platforms: 2

Other information
- Station code: 30002

History
- Opened: 26 July 1893; 133 years ago
Location

The Plasencia railway station is a railway station serving the Spanish city of Plasencia, in the province of Cáceres.

It was inaugurated on 26 July 1893, with the opening of the 55 km stretch between Plasencia and Hervás of the wider Plasencia–Astorga line (now closed). Its construction and operation was awarded to the Compañía de los Ferrocarriles de Madrid a Cáceres y Portugal (MCP).
