= Cerezo de Arriba =

- Municipality
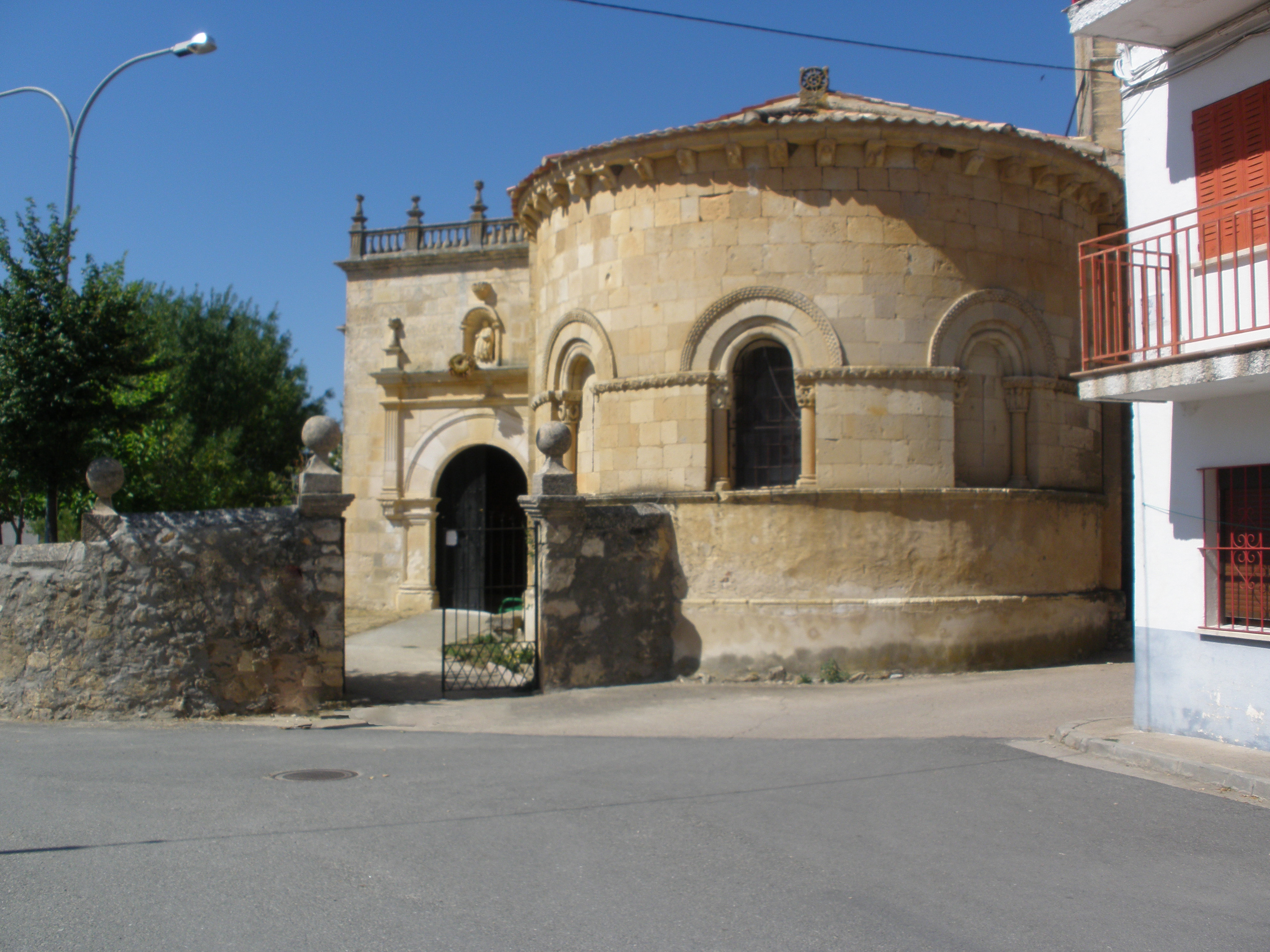
- Church of St. John

- Location in Spain. Cerezo de Arriba (Spain)
- Coordinates: 41°14′16″N 3°33′27″W
- Country: Spain
- Autonomous community: Castile and León
- Province: Segovia
- Comarca: Comunidad de Villa y Tierra de Sepúlveda

Government
  - Mayor: Félix Pérez Adrados

Area
  - Total: 48.66 km^{2} (18.79 sq mi)
- Elevation: 1,129 m (3,704 ft)

Population (2025-01-01)
  - Total: 119
  - Density: 2.45/km^{2} (6.33/sq mi)
- Demonym: Cerezanos
- Time zone: UTC+1 (CET)
  - Summer (DST): UTC+2 (CEST)
- Website: Official website

Cerezo de Arriba is a municipality located in the province of Segovia, Castile and León, Spain. La Pinilla is a ski area located in Cerezo de Arriba.

== See also ==
- Cerezo de Abajo
