= Taboada Bridge =

10th century stone bridge in Spain

Taboada Bridge Ponte Taboada
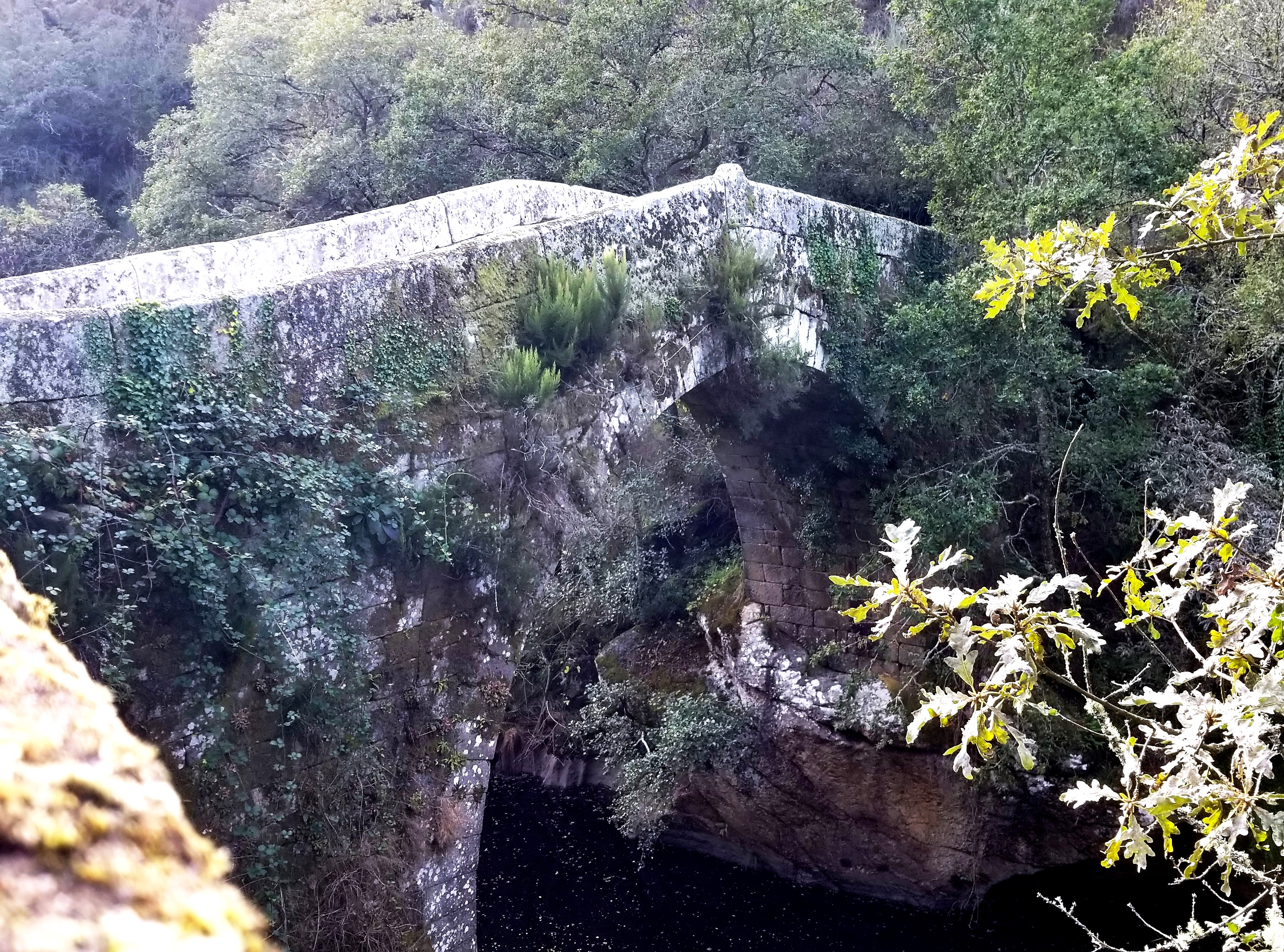
- Taboada Bridge over the river Deza in Galicia, Spain. This Romanesque bridge was built in 912.
- Coordinates: 42°40′46″N 8°12′35″W
- Locale: Silleda Council, Province of Pontevedra, Galicia, Spain
- Official name: Ponte Taboada
- Heritage status: Romanesque

Characteristics
- Material: Granite Stone
- Height: 9 meters over the river waterline

History
- Construction end: 912

Location
- Interactive map of Taboada Bridge

The Ponte Taboada (Galician language), Puente Taboada (Spanish language) or Taboada Bridge, is a 10th century Romanesque stone bridge over the river Deza in the Silleda Municipality on the Province of Pontevedra, Spain. The bridge is part of the Silver Way (Via de la Plata) of the Camino de Santiago

== History ==
The bridge was built in the year 912 and joins the parish of Taboada from the Silleda Municipality, to which the bridge belongs, to the parish of Prado in the Lalin Municipality.

== Description ==
The Taboada bridge, also known as the Taboada Viejo (old) bridge, mistakenly called roman, is a Romanesque bridge that was part of the so-called Camino Real (Royal Way) that joined the cities of Santiago de Compostela and Ourense. The bridge most likely replaced other wooden bridges built on the same spot from which it took its name (Pons Tabulata). Upon the modification of the layout of the local roads in the second half of the XIX century, and after the construction of a newer nearby bridge (Puente de Taboada Nuevo, or New Taboada Bridge), the use of the old bridge has declined.

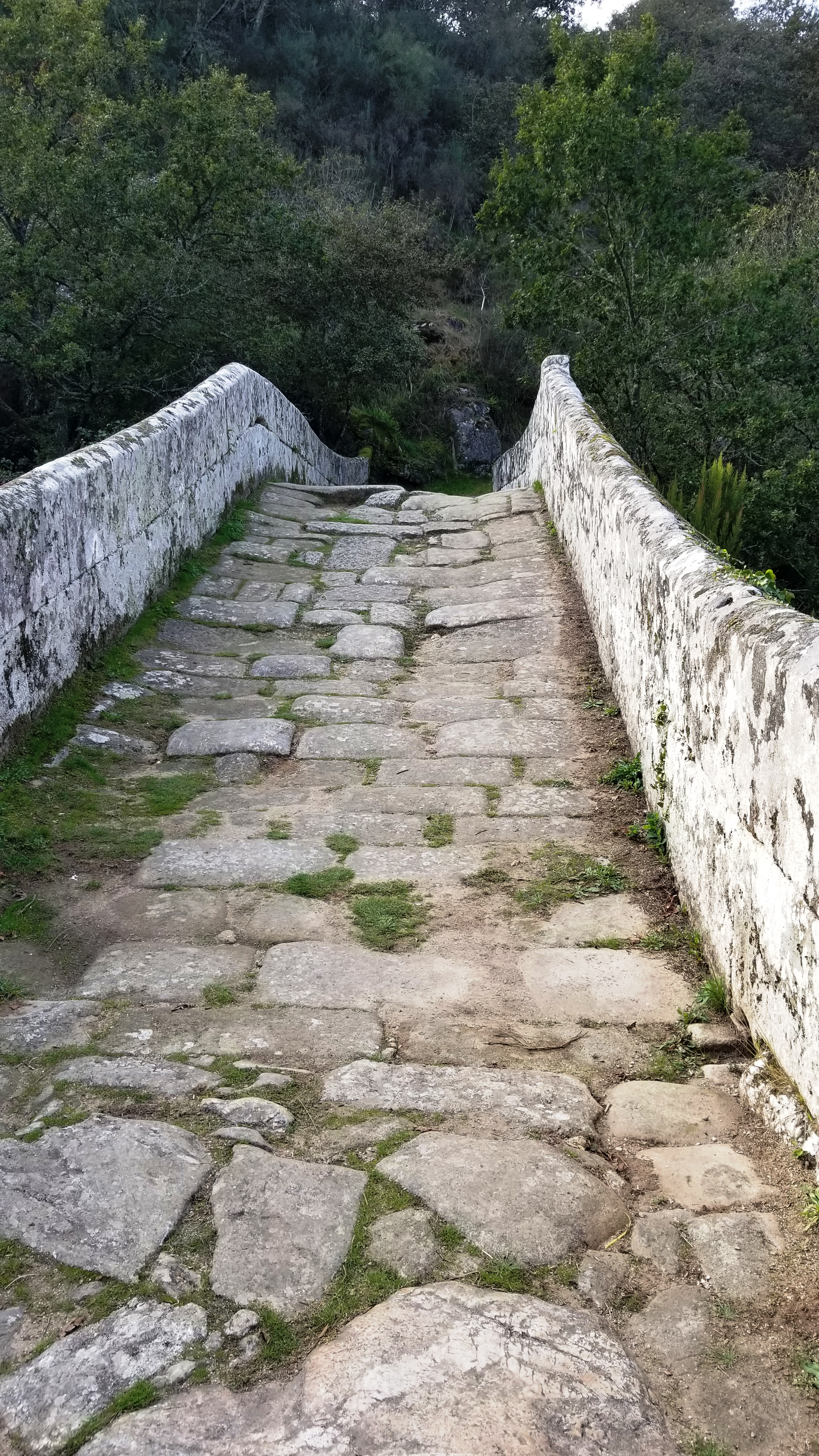
Entrance to the Taboada Bridge.

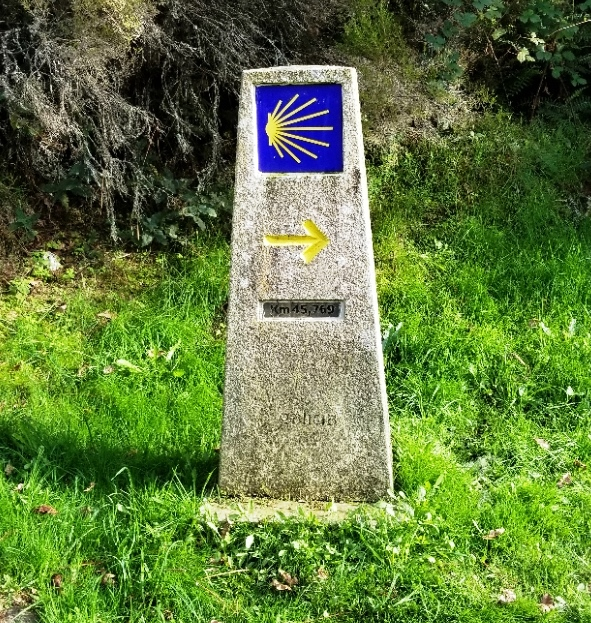
Marker for the Camino de Santiago located near the bridge. These markers point the way to Santiago de Compostela for the pilgrims.

The bridge, an ashlar stone bridge, was built with a single half point arch and remarkable height. The bridge was built over two large boulders that reduce the width of the river to around 11 meters. The highest point of the arch stands some 9 meters over the river’s waterline. A double access ramp, of about 2.85 meters wide, built with stone slabs and stone pavers completes the design.

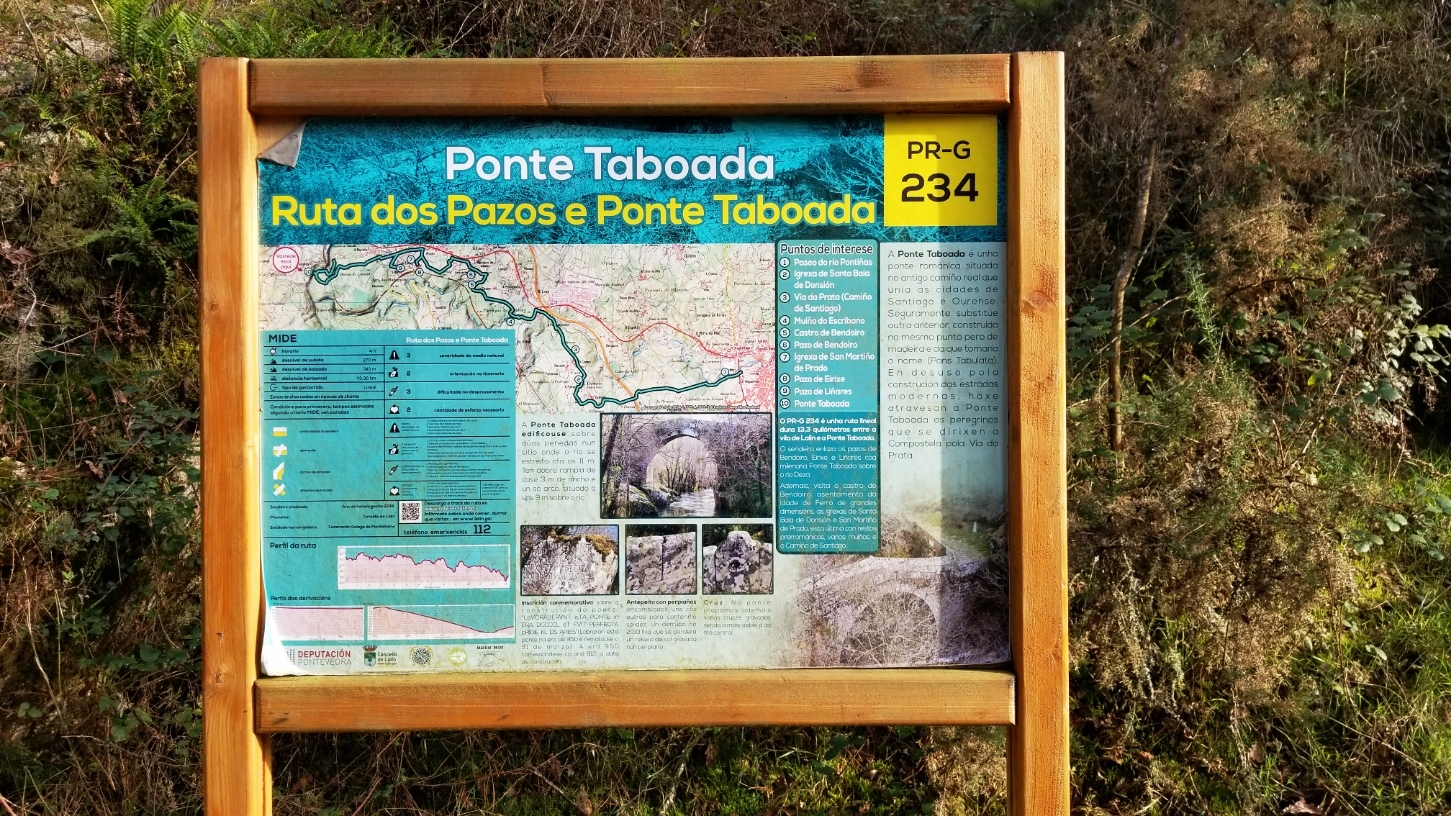
Plaque with information about the bridge.

A few meters after crossing the bridge an inscription in Latin characters on a deteriorated nearby large boulder reads: “LaVORABERVNT isTA PONTE In ERA DCCCCL eT FVIT PERFECTA pRIDIE KL DS APIES”, which translates to “Worked on this bridge in the era of 950 and was finished the 31 of March.” The era of 950 corresponds to the year 912, its date of construction.

== Current use ==
Currently, the main use of the bridge is for pilgrims, walking the Via de la Plata (Silver Way) of the Camino de Santiago.
