= Baños de Montemayor =

Coordinates: 40°19′5″N 5°51′27″W

Baños de Montemayor, Spain
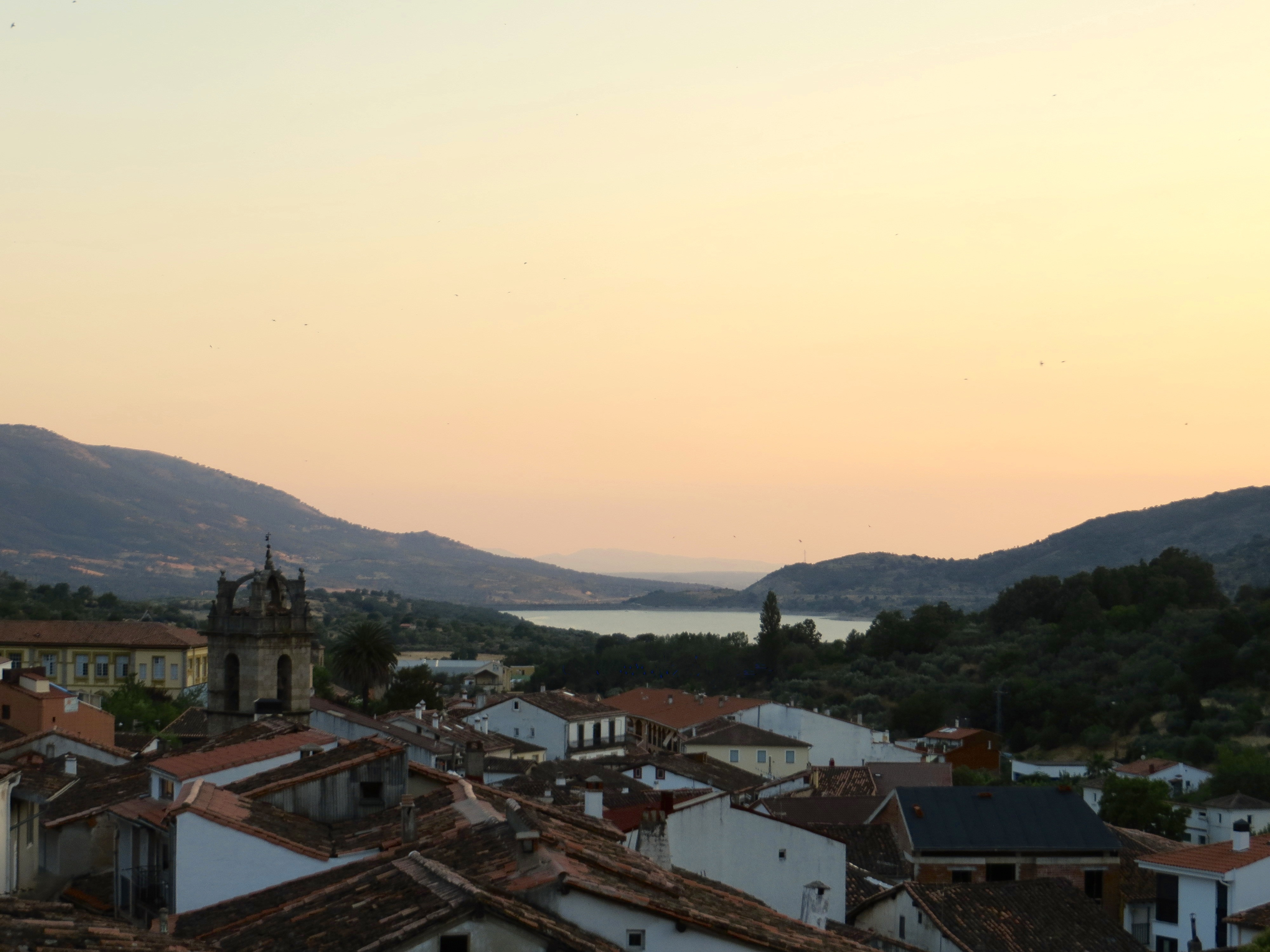
- View of Baños de Montemayor

- Flag Coat of arms
- Interactive map of Baños de Montemayor, Spain
- Country: Spain
- Autonomous community: Extremadura
- Province: Cáceres
- Municipality: Baños de Montemayor

Area
  - Total: 21 km^{2} (8.1 sq mi)
- Elevation: 700 m (2,300 ft)

Population (2025-01-01)
  - Total: 738
  - Density: 35/km^{2} (91/sq mi)
- Time zone: UTC+1 (CET)
  - Summer (DST): UTC+2 (CEST)
- Website: https://www.banosdemontemayor.es/

Baños de Montemayor (Spanish pronunciation: [ˈbaɲos ðe montemaˈʝoɾ]) is a spa town located in the north of the province of Cáceres, Extremadura, Spain. The village is known for its Roman-built baths. According to the 2017 census (INE), the village has a population of 774 inhabitants. Baños is located in the Ambroz Valley.

The village became a spa with the Latin name Aquae Caprense when the Romans built baths in what it was the middle of Vía de la Plata, although hot springs were known even before then.

== History ==
The town has a Roman origin, as proven by the archaeological remains found in its historic center. Thus, Roman ruins are preserved in the current spa (together with remains of medieval baths) and an inscription dedicated to the Caparenses nymphs. Also it is possible to find a milestone from Trajan's and another one from Hadrian's as part of La Plata route that crosses the eastern part of the town. In addition, the bridge called "El Cubo" over the river Baños', has also a Roman origin, remains of part of the arch and the pillars are conserved. It belonged to a secondary road, which, starting from the La Plata highway, took the west direction.

== Geography and environment ==
The geography of Baños is very uneven since it is surrounded by mountains of 850 to 1,200 meters high with abundant forests of chestnut trees and other native species. Its privileged location, at the back of the Ambroz Valley, means that Baños has a mild climate both in summer and in winter.

One of its main characteristics, derived from its situation at the head of a valley, is the abundance of water, finding numerous natural sources and springs both within the urban area and in the environment.

== See also ==
- List of municipalities in Cáceres
