= La Pinilla ski resort =

Ski resort in Sierra de Ayllón, Spain

Coordinates: 41°12′12.25″N 3°28′20.44″W

La Pinilla

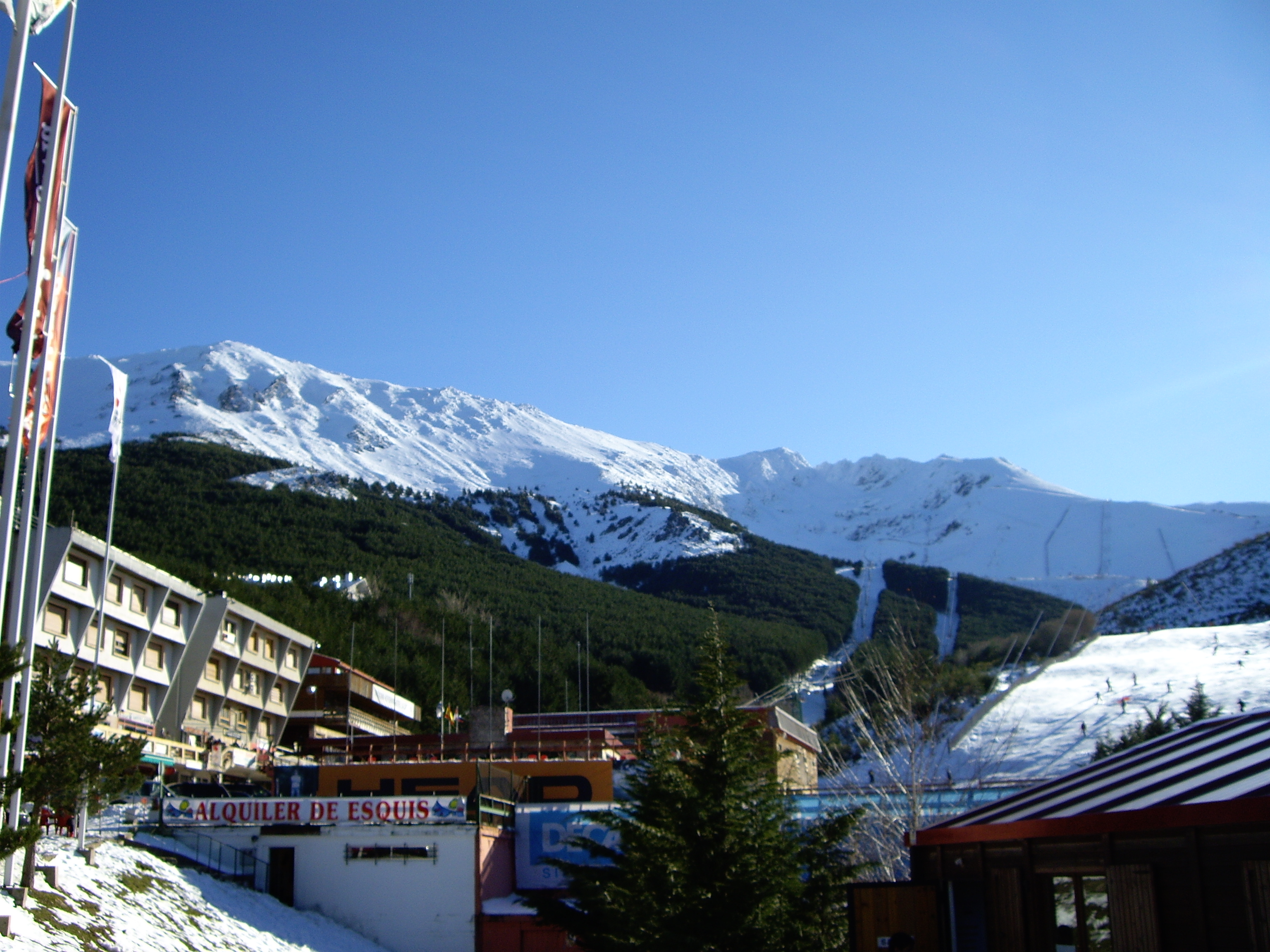
- Interactive map of La Pinilla
- Location: Sierra de Ayllón, Spain
- Nearest city: Madrid
- Top elevation: 2,273 m (7,457 ft)
- Base elevation: 1,497 m (4,911 ft)
- Skiable area: 20 km
- Trails: 24
- Lift system: 1 gondola lift 3 chair lifts. 7 ski tows.
- Website: http://www.lapinilla.es

La Pinilla is a ski area situated near the town of Riaza (Segovia) in the Sierra de Ayllón, 100 kilometres away from Madrid (Spain).

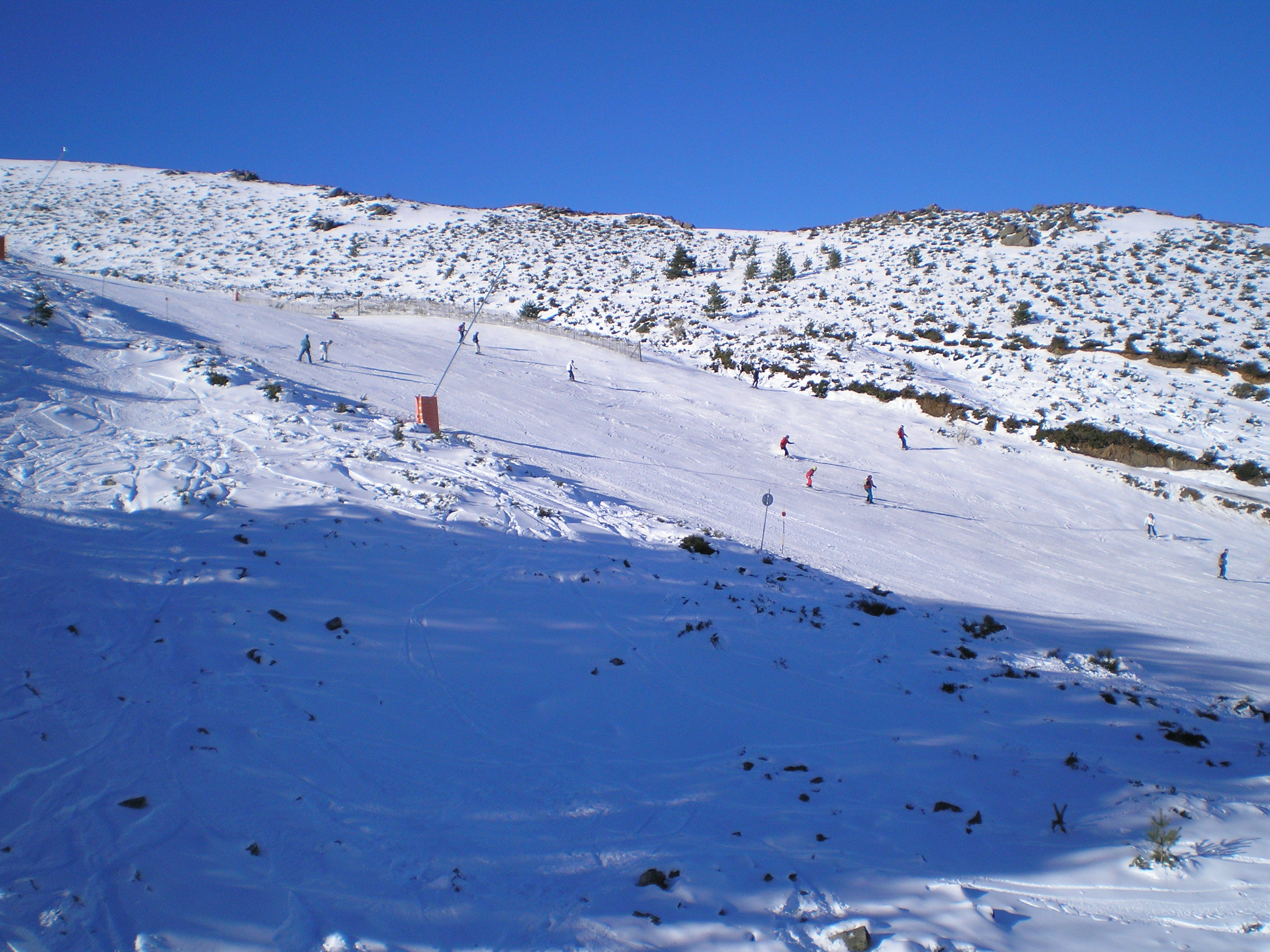
Testeros zone, La Pinilla.

== Resort ==
It has 20 km of marked pistes. The base of the area is situated at 1497 m AMSL. The highest point is the Pico del Lobo, 2273 m AMSL, with a vertical drop of 776 m. La Pinilla has 189 artificial snow cannons.

=== Lifts ===
All of the resort's lifts are modern and of high capacity, the resort has:

- 1 gondola lift
- 3 chair lifts
- 7 ski tows.

=== Pistes ===
The resort offers 23 pistes of different difficulties:

- 4 beginners.
- 6 easy.
- 13 intermediate.

=== Services ===
- 3 restaurants.
- 1 skiing school.
- 1 snow gardens for children.
- 2 ski hiring stores.
- ATM
