= Cerezo, Cáceres =

Cerezo
- municipality
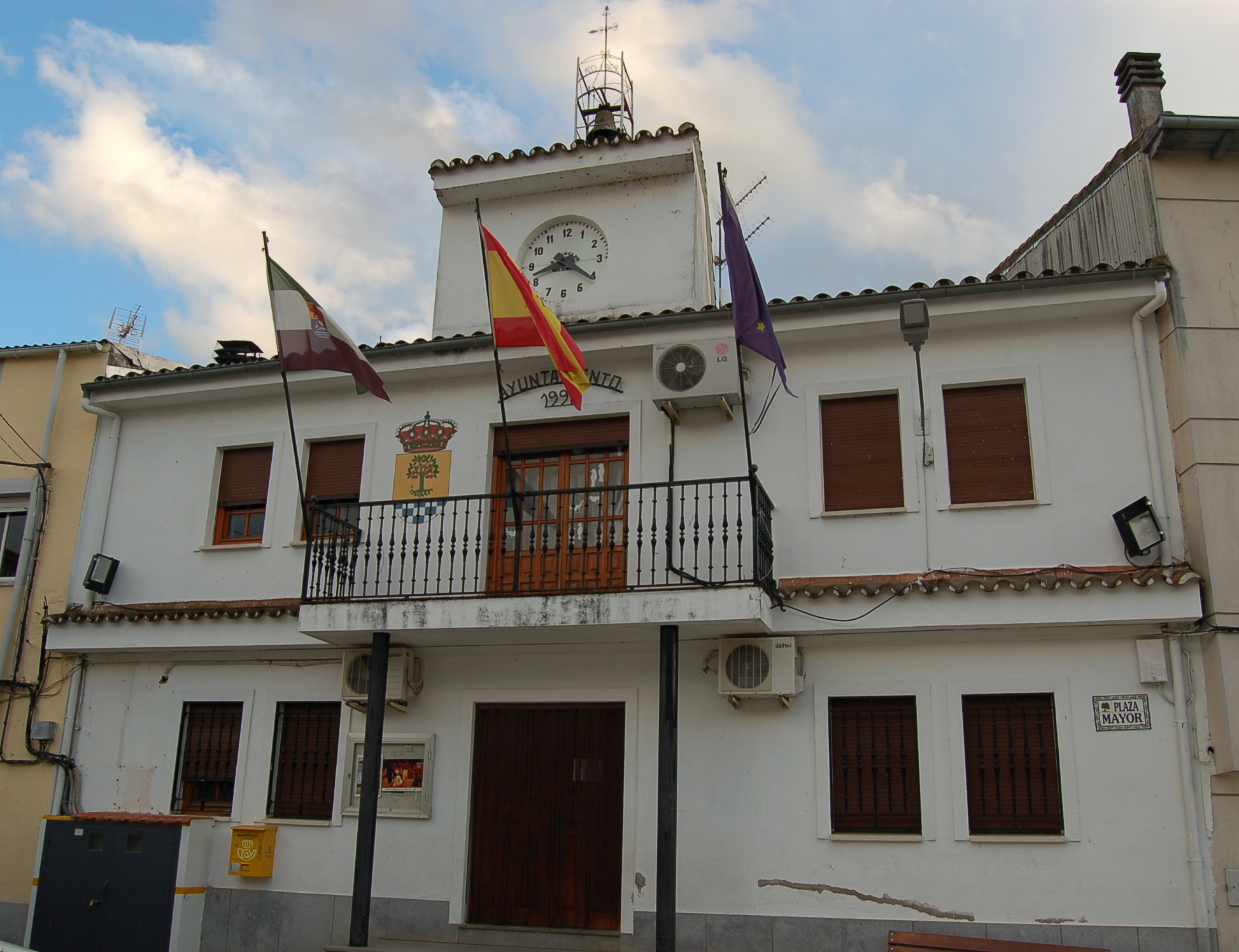
- Town hall

- Coat of arms

- Location in Spain.
- Coordinates: 40°14′11″N 6°13′28″W
- Country: Spain
- Autonomous community: Extremadura
- Province: Cáceres
- Comarca: Tierras de Granadilla

Government
  - Mayor: José Antonio González Rodríguez

Area
  - Total: 18.14 km^{2} (7.00 sq mi)

Population (2025-01-01)
  - Total: 147
  - Density: 8.10/km^{2} (21.0/sq mi)
- Time zone: UTC+1 (CET)
  - Summer (DST): UTC+2 (CEST)

Cerezo (Spanish pronunciation: [θeˈɾeθo]) is a municipality located in the province of Cáceres, Extremadura, western Spain.

== See also ==
- List of municipalities in Cáceres
