= Gargantilla =

- Municipality
- Flag Coat of arms

- Location in Spain
- Coordinates: 40°14′54″N 5°55′13″W
- Country: Spain
- Community: Extremadura
- Province: Cáceres
- Comarca: Valle del Ambroz

Area
  - Total: 20.87 km^{2} (8.06 sq mi)

Population (2025-01-01)
  - Total: 346
  - Density: 16.6/km^{2} (42.9/sq mi)
- Time zone: UTC+1 (CET)
  - Summer (DST): UTC+2 (CEST)

Gargantilla is a municipality located in the province of Cáceres, Extremadura, Spain. According to the 2006 census (INE), the municipality has a population of 450 inhabitants.

== See also ==
- List of municipalities in Cáceres
