= Santa Cruz de Paniagua =

Coordinates: 40°12′N 6°20′W

Santa Cruz de Paniagua, Spain
- municipality
- Coat of arms
- Interactive map of Santa Cruz de Paniagua, Spain
- Country: Spain
- Autonomous community: Extremadura
- Province: Cáceres
- Municipality: Santa Cruz de Paniagua

Area
  - Total: 83 km^{2} (32 sq mi)

Population (2025-01-01)
  - Total: 286
  - Density: 3.4/km^{2} (8.9/sq mi)
- Time zone: UTC+1 (CET)
  - Summer (DST): UTC+2 (CEST)

Santa Cruz de Paniagua is a municipality located in the province of Cáceres, Extremadura, Spain. According to the 2006 census (INE), the municipality has a population of 372 inhabitants.

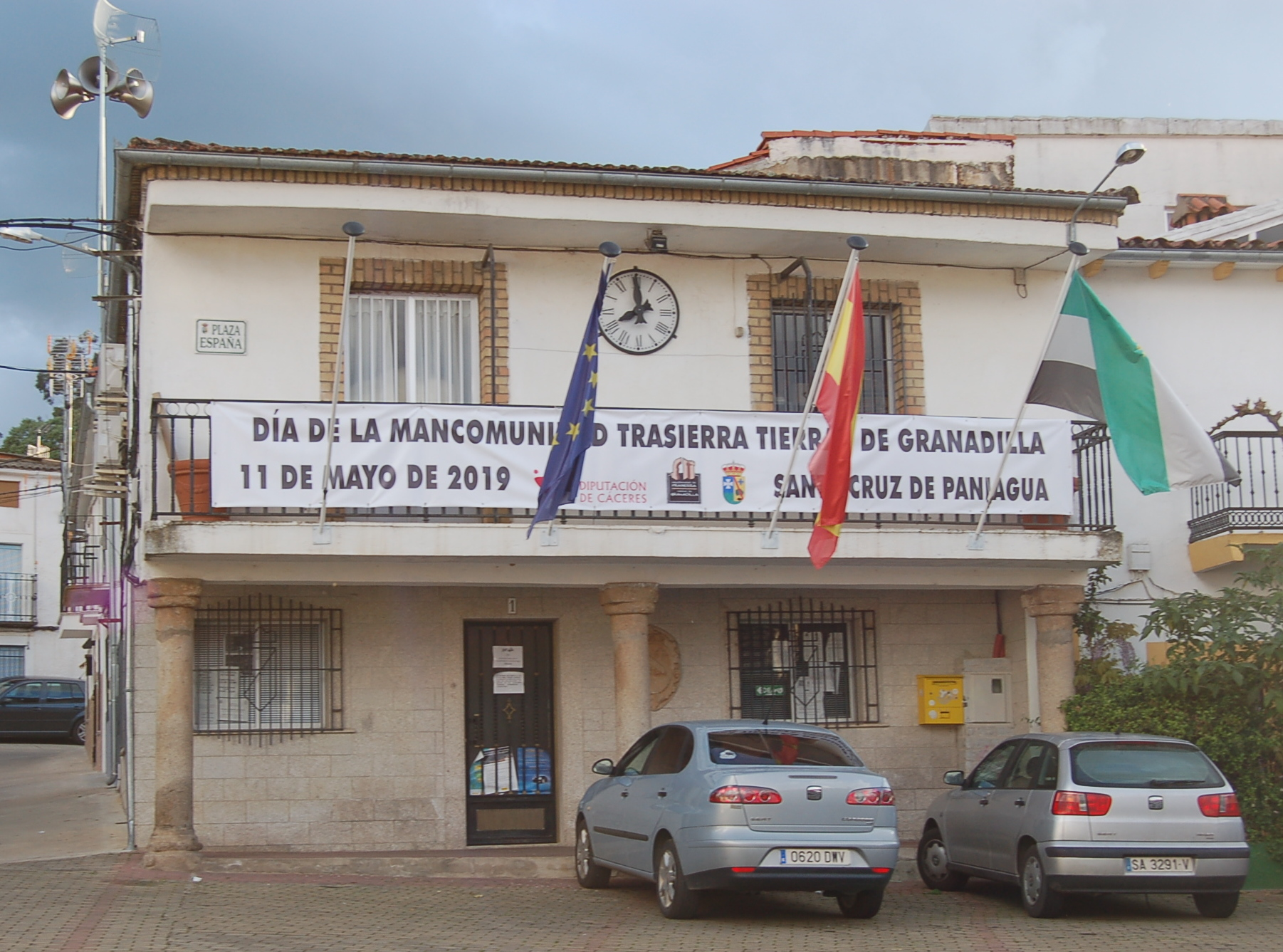
Santa Cruz de Paniagua Town Hall

== See also ==
- List of municipalities in Cáceres
