= Efrén Cerezo Torres =

Mexican politician

- Born: 18 June 1946 (age 79); Mexico City, Mexico
- Occupation: Politician
- Political party: PRI

Roberto Efrén Cerezo Torres (born 18 June 1946) is a Mexican politician from the Institutional Revolutionary Party. In 2009, he was a deputy of the LX Legislature of the Mexican Congress representing the Federal District.
