= Cerezo Hilgen =

Dutch footballer (born 1994)

Personal information
- Date of birth: 3 May 1994 (age 32)
- Place of birth: Amsterdam, Netherlands
- Height: 1.84 m (6 ft 0 in)
- Position: Centre-back

Team information
- Current team: DIOS

Youth career
- –2010: AFC
- 2010–2013: Volendam

Senior career*
Years	Team	Apps	(Gls)
2013–2014	Volendam	0	(0)
2014–2015	OFC		
2016	Lienden	0	(0)
2016–2017	Dordrecht	12	(0)
2017–2018	Rot-Weiss Frankfurt	0	(0)
2018–2019	Kalamata	19	(1)
2019	Luftëtari	2	(0)
2020	North Shore United	1	(0)
2021	Víkingur Ólafsvík	4	(0)
2021	Eskilstuna City	8	(1)
- * Club domestic league appearances and goals as of 20:46, 17 October 2022 (UTC)

Cerezo Hilgen (born 3 May 1994) is a Dutch football player who plays as a centre-back.

== Club career ==
He made his professional debut in the Eerste Divisie for FC Dordrecht on 9 December 2016 in a game against SC Telstar. In 2018 he joined Greek side Kalamata, despite aiming to find an Asian club to join. He then had short spells with Albanian side Luftëtari and in New Zealand with North Shore United.

In 2023, Hilgen returned to the Netherlands to play for SV DIOS from Nieuw Vennep.
