= La Pesga =

Coordinates: 40°20′N 6°10′W

- municipality
- Coat of arms

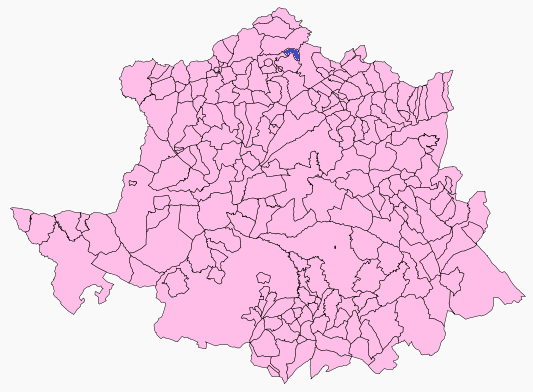
- Location of La Pesga in Caceres Province
- Country: Spain
- Autonomous community: Extremadura
- Province: Cáceres
- Municipality: La Pesga

Area
  - Total: 20 km^{2} (7.7 sq mi)
- Elevation: 445 m (1,460 ft)

Population (2025-01-01)
  - Total: 950
  - Density: 48/km^{2} (120/sq mi)
- Time zone: UTC+1 (CET)
  - Summer (DST): UTC+2 (CEST)

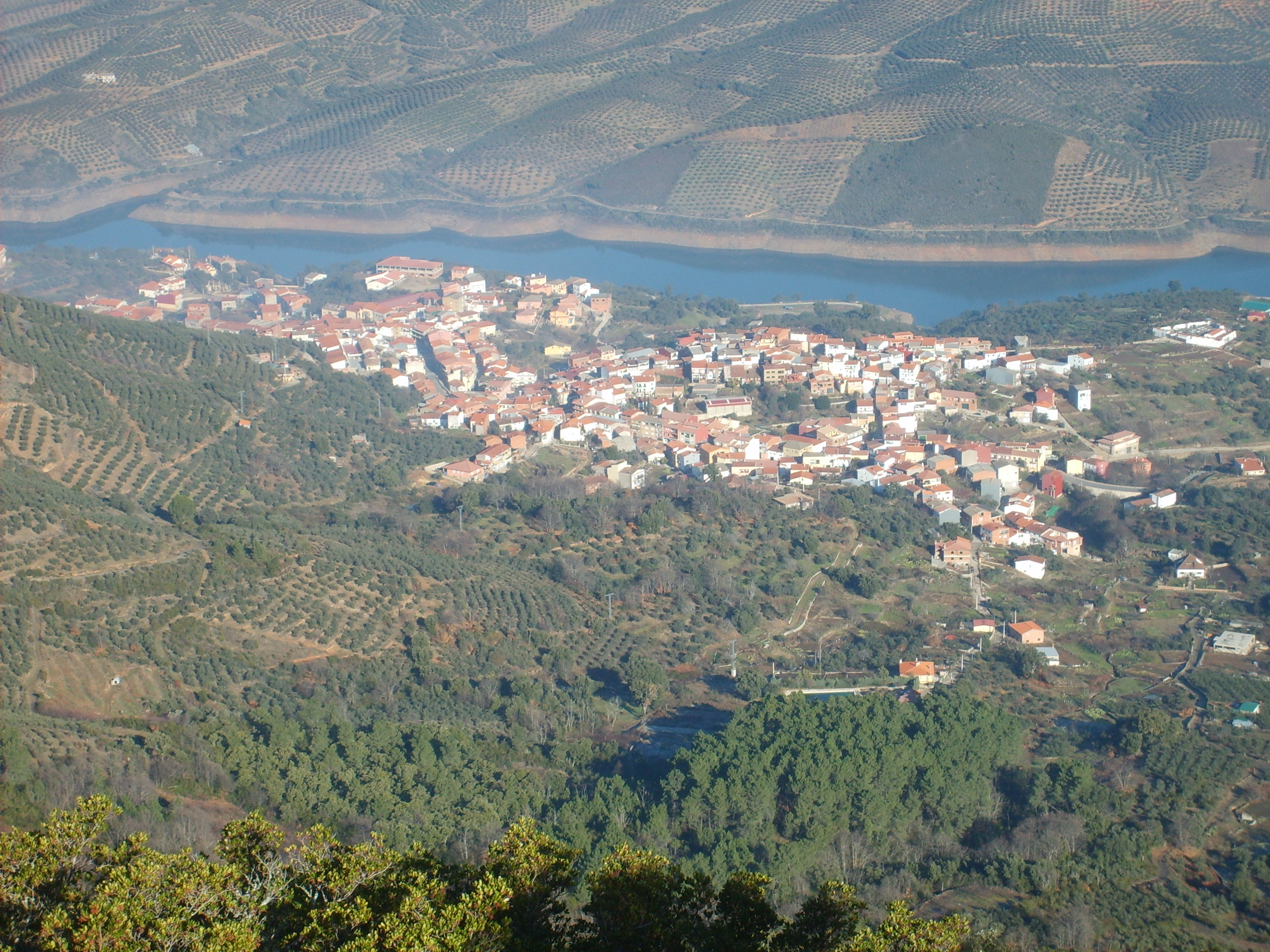
View of La Pesga

La Pesga is a municipality located in Trasierra/Tierras de Granadilla, province of Cáceres, Extremadura, Spain. According to the 2023 census, the municipality has a population of 977, down from 1162 inhabitants as of the 2005 census (INE).

The Los Angeles River flows by the town, located near the limit with Las Hurdes.

== See also ==
- Trasierra/Tierras de Granadilla
- List of municipalities in Cáceres
