= Santibáñez el Bajo =

Coordinates: 40°11′N 6°13′W

Santibáñez el Bajo, Spain
- municipality
- Flag Coat of arms
- Interactive map of Santibáñez el Bajo, Spain
- Country: Spain
- Autonomous community: Extremadura
- Province: Cáceres
- Municipality: Santibáñez el Bajo

Area
  - Total: 46 km^{2} (18 sq mi)

Population (2025-01-01)
  - Total: 711
  - Density: 15/km^{2} (40/sq mi)
- Time zone: UTC+1 (CET)
  - Summer (DST): UTC+2 (CEST)

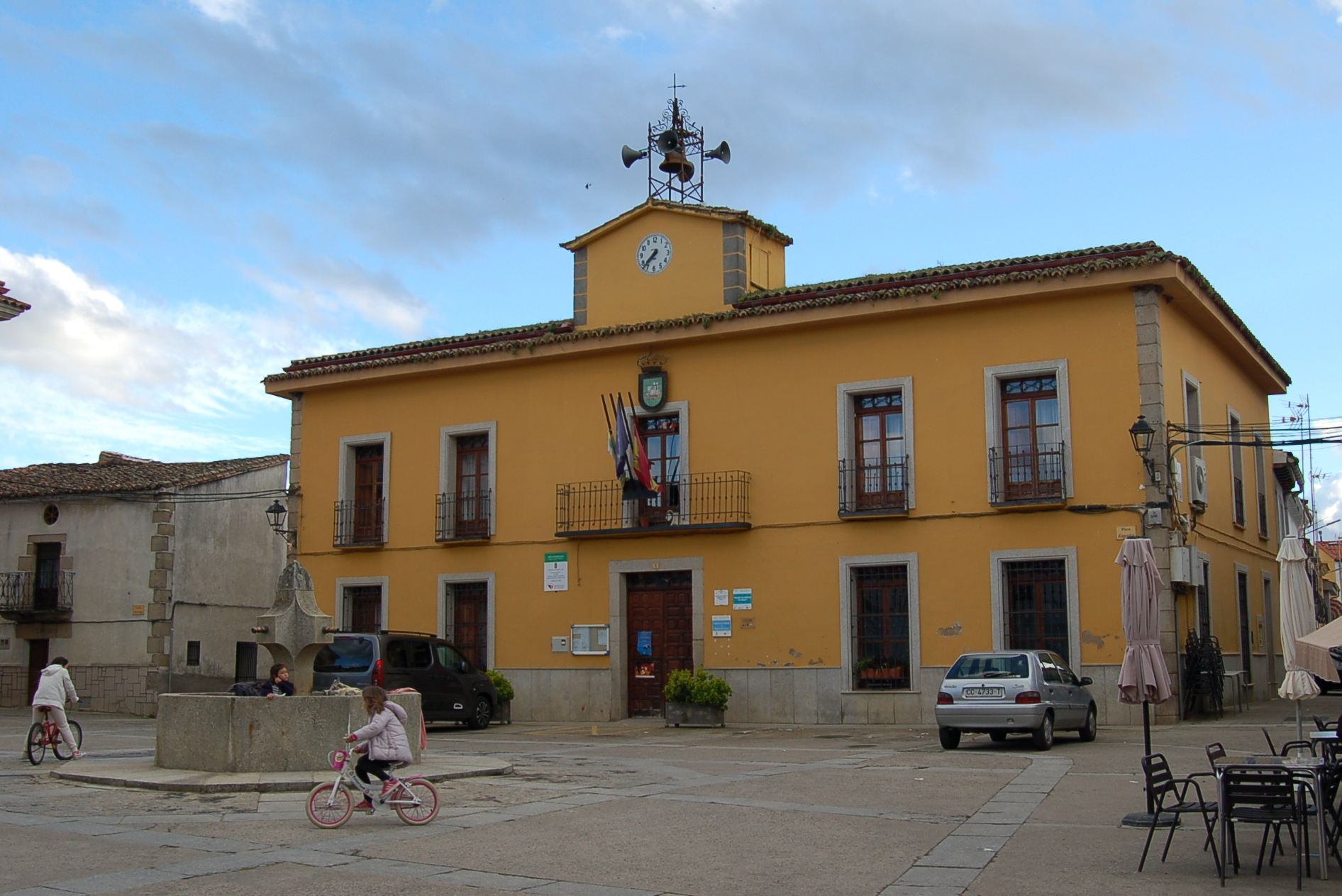
A photograph of the front view of Santibáñez el Bajo Town Hall

Santibáñez el Bajo (Spanish pronunciation: [san.tiˈβa.ɲeθ el ˈβa.xo]) is a municipality located in the province of Cáceres, Extremadura, Spain. According to the 2006 census (INE), the municipality has a population of 863 inhabitants.

== See also ==
- List of municipalities in Cáceres
