= Casar de Palomero =

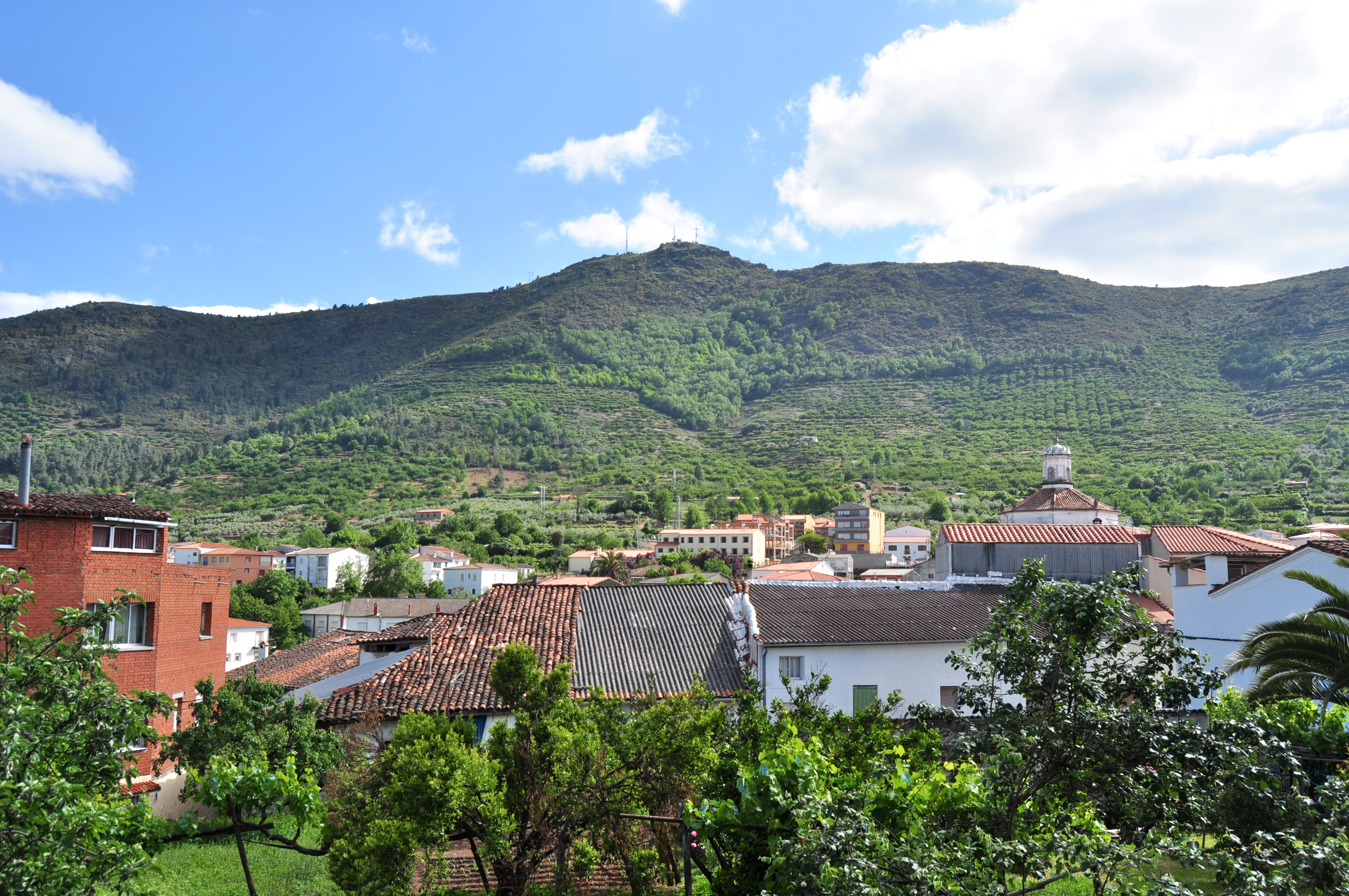
- Overlooking the mountains in Casar de Palomero

- Flag Coat of arms

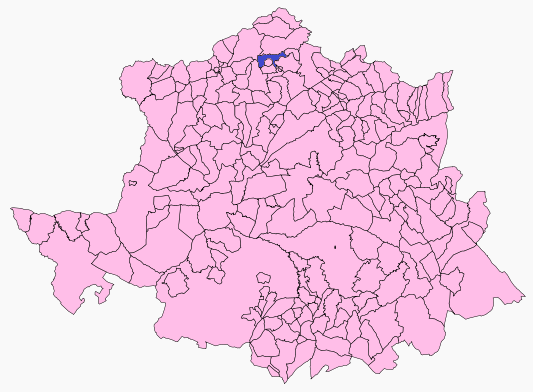
- Map of Casar de Palomero, Spain
- Coordinates: 40°22′N 6°13′W
- Country: Spain
- Autonomous community: Extremadura
- Province: Cáceres
- Municipality: Casar de Palomero

Area
  - Total: 37 km^{2} (14 sq mi)

Population (2025-01-01)
  - Total: 991
  - Density: 27/km^{2} (69/sq mi)
- Time zone: UTC+1 (CET)
  - Summer (DST): UTC+2 (CEST)

Casar de Palomero is a municipality located in the province of Cáceres, Extremadura, Spain. According to the 2005 census (INE), the municipality has a population of 1,343 inhabitants.

Casar de Palomero is historically not part of Las Hurdes region. However, it eventually merged with the other municipalities of the comarca to form the Mancomunidad de Las Hurdes.

== See also ==
- List of municipalities in Cáceres
