= Marchagaz =

Marchagaz, Spain
- municipality
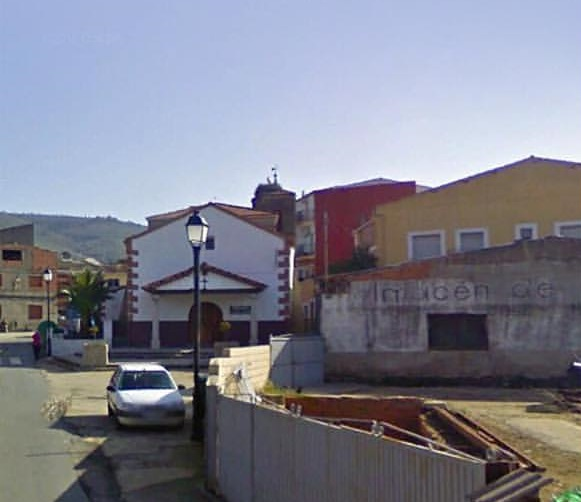
- Church and church surroundings in the Spanish municipality of Marchagaz, in the province of Cáceres.

- Flag Coat of arms
- Interactive map of Marchagaz, Spain
- Coordinates: 40°16′N 6°16′W
- Country: Spain
- Autonomous community: Extremadura
- Province: Cáceres
- Municipality: Marchagaz

Area
  - Total: 9 km^{2} (3.5 sq mi)
- Elevation: 514 m (1,686 ft)

Population (2025-01-01)
  - Total: 231
  - Density: 26/km^{2} (66/sq mi)
- Time zone: UTC+1 (CET)
  - Summer (DST): UTC+2 (CEST)

Marchagaz (Spanish pronunciation: [maɾ.tʃaˈɣaθ]) is a municipality located in the province of Cáceres, Extremadura, Spain. According to the 2006 census (INE), the municipality has a population of 269 inhabitants.

== See also ==
- List of municipalities in Cáceres
