= Palomero =

Palomero, Spain
- municipality
- Flag Coat of arms
- Interactive map of Palomero, Spain
- Coordinates: 39°31′N 5°25′W
- Country: Spain
- Autonomous community: Extremadura
- Province: Cáceres
- Municipality: Palomero

Area
  - Total: 20 km^{2} (7.7 sq mi)
- Elevation: 453 m (1,486 ft)

Population (2025-01-01)
  - Total: 450
  - Density: 22/km^{2} (58/sq mi)
- Time zone: UTC+1 (CET)
  - Summer (DST): UTC+2 (CEST)

Palomero is a municipality located in the province of Cáceres, Extremadura, Spain. According to the 2007 census (INE), the municipality has a population of 498 inhabitants.

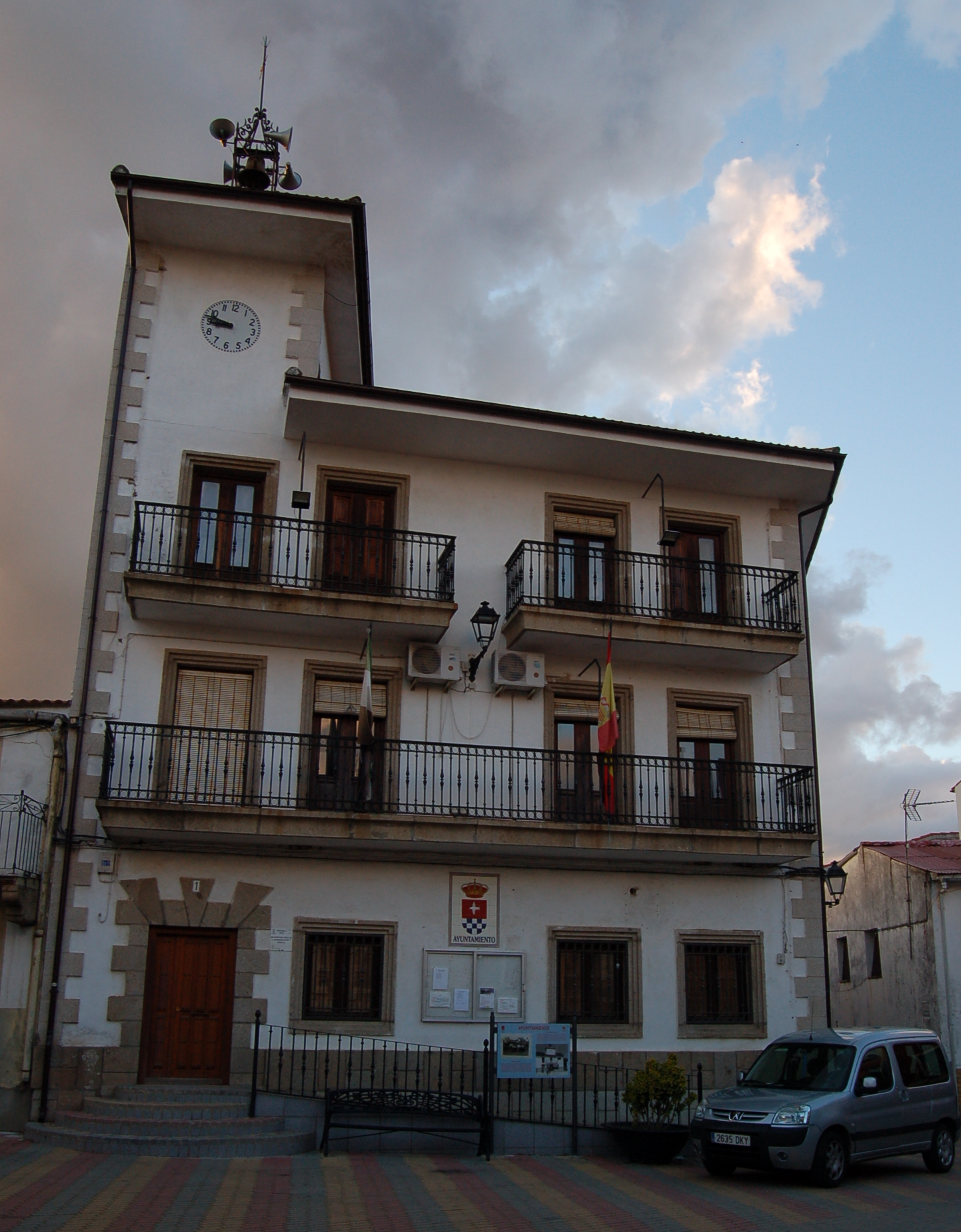
Palomero Town Hall

== Physical geography ==
The situation of this municipality stands out, since it is surrounded by the most beautiful landscapes in the north of the province of Cáceres (Sierra de Gata, Valle del Jerte, Las Hurdes and Valle del Ambroz). The northern part of the territory is mainly mountainous, highlighting the hills of La Orden and Las Barreras, with an altitude of just over 786m (sastre hill). The southern part of the municipality is less mountainous, although the terrain is undulating with small hills.

The closest towns are Marchagaz (3 km), Cerezo and El Bronco (6 km), Santa Cruz de Paniagua (9 km), Casar de Palomero (10 km) and Mohedas de Granadilla (12 km). Plasencia, which is the commercial and industrial center of the northern zone and head of the judicial district, is about 45 km away and Cáceres capital about 115 km. Salamanca is located about 130 km.

The north of its municipal term limits with the municipalities of Marchagaz and Casar de Palomero, the south with the term of Cerezo, the west with Santa Cruz de Paniagua and the east again with Cerezo and Casar de Palomero.

== History ==
Its origins are not well defined, although it is certainly an ancient population, since tombs without inscriptions have been found whose characteristics are not those expected from Christian or Muslim rites, and therefore, they suppose a much earlier origin. There is a document from 1030 (of doubtful origin) in which Casar de Palomero (houses of Palomero), Palomero and Marchagaz (a nearby town) are mentioned as municipalities dependent on the convent of Sancti Spíritus de Salamanca, to which they ceded as vassalage a series of products on the date of Nativity. A little later, is a document delimiting the terms of a domain known as Palumbarium (which could be referred to Palomero) and Granata, later known as Granadilla. It is known that there was a castle at the top of the Altamira peak, in the Sierra de Santa Bárbara, later destroyed in 1489 by order of Queen Isabel the Catholic and at the request of the Sancti Spíritus Commander.

Given that there is reliable evidence of Roman occupation in nearby towns, it can be assumed that it must also have been a Roman settlement, given the proximity of towns such as Cáparra, where there are excavations and important archaeological sites of Roman origin (there is an interesting center of interpretation).

A series of unclassified remains have also appeared, such as pipes and the previously described tombs, which could help to better understand the history of the municipality.

It is mistakenly interpreted that Palomero belonged to the House of Alba, as reflected in its current and wrong coat of arms, but in reality it was never like that. Nor is it true that it belonged to Granadilla (Granata) and in fact there are abundant documents that prove it, such as the delimitation of terms between the two towns in the Late Middle Ages and that "Granata" appears later than "Palumbarium".

== See also ==
- List of municipalities in Cáceres
