= Cerezo de Abajo =

- Municipality
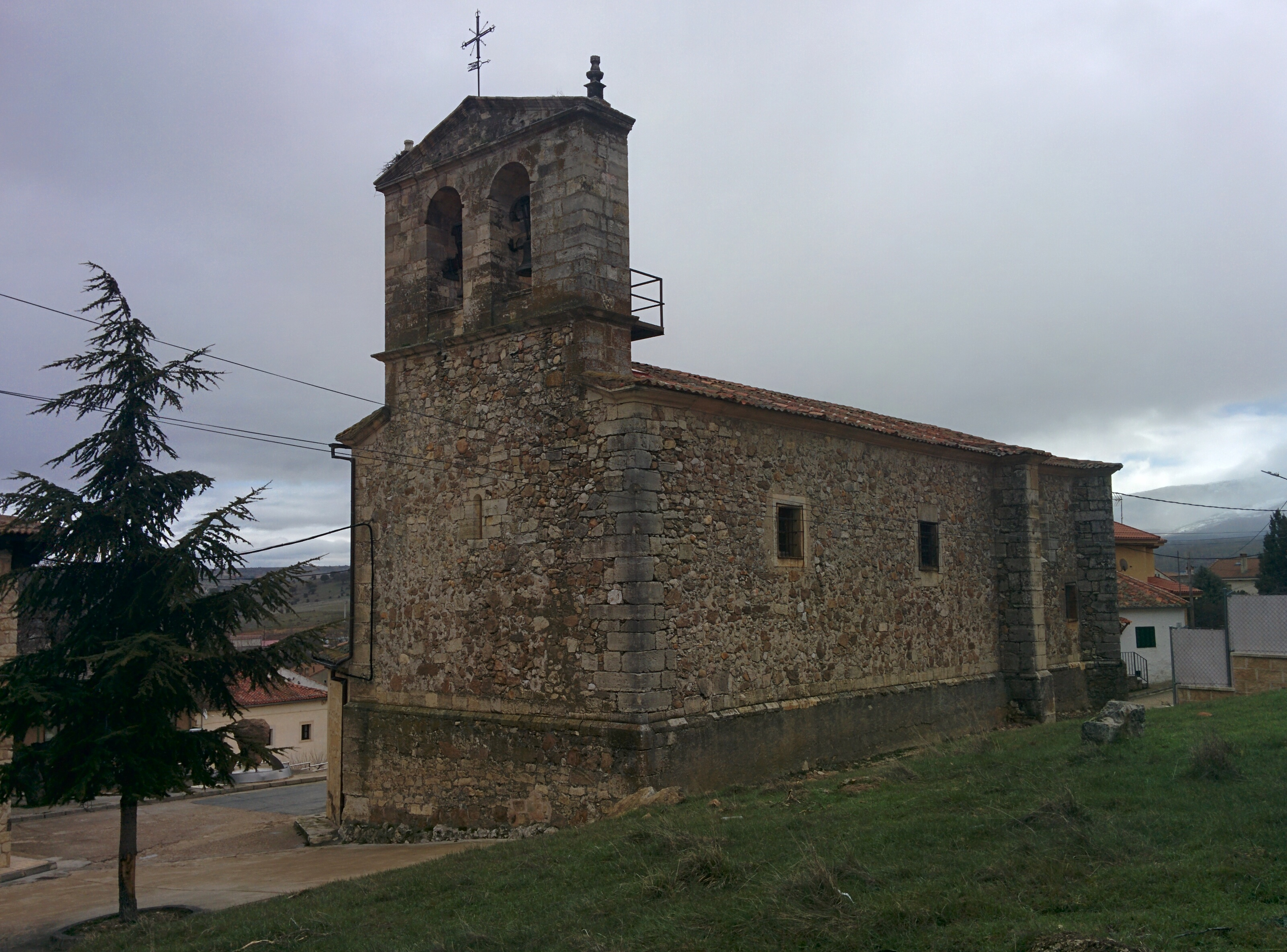
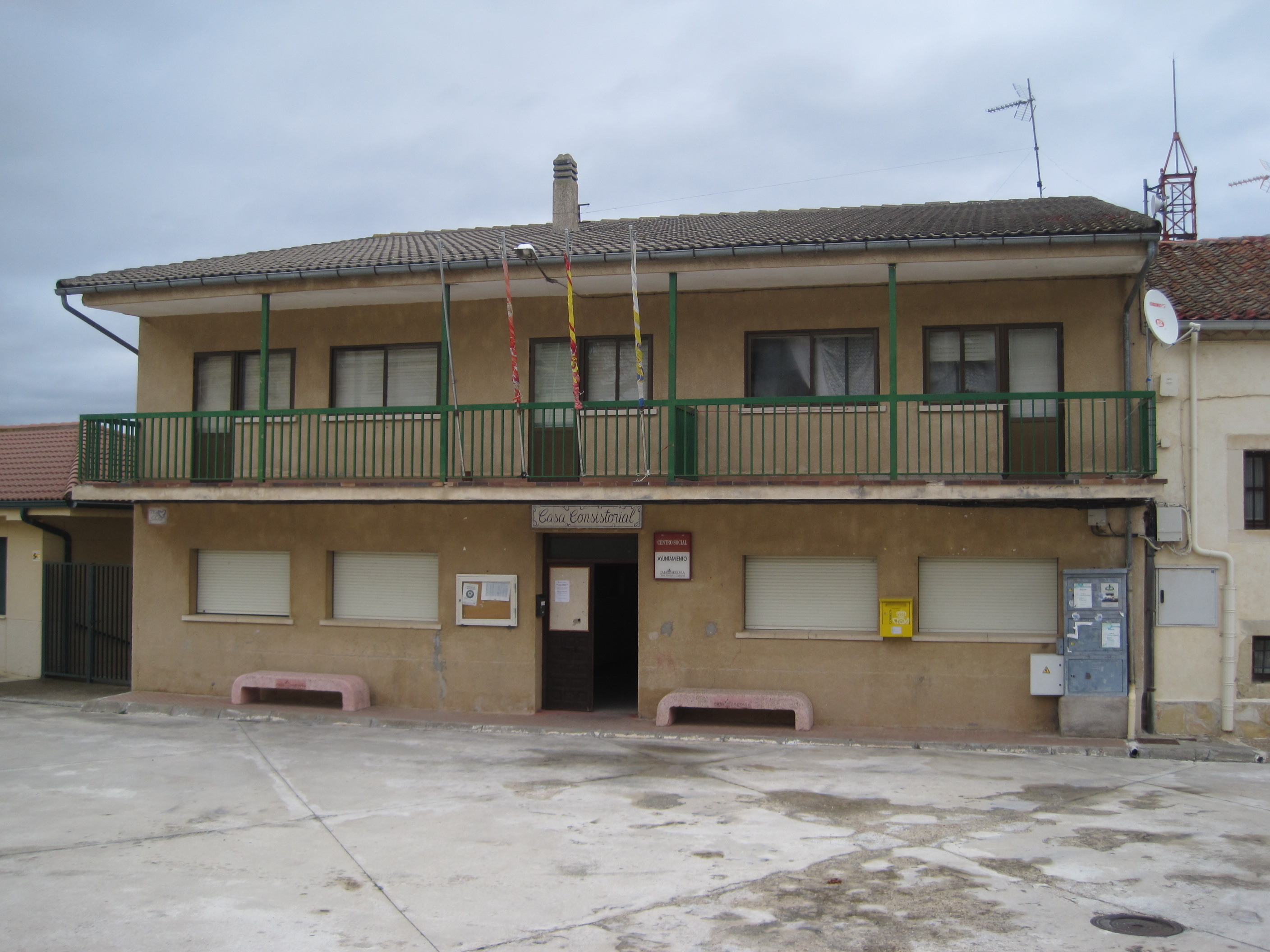
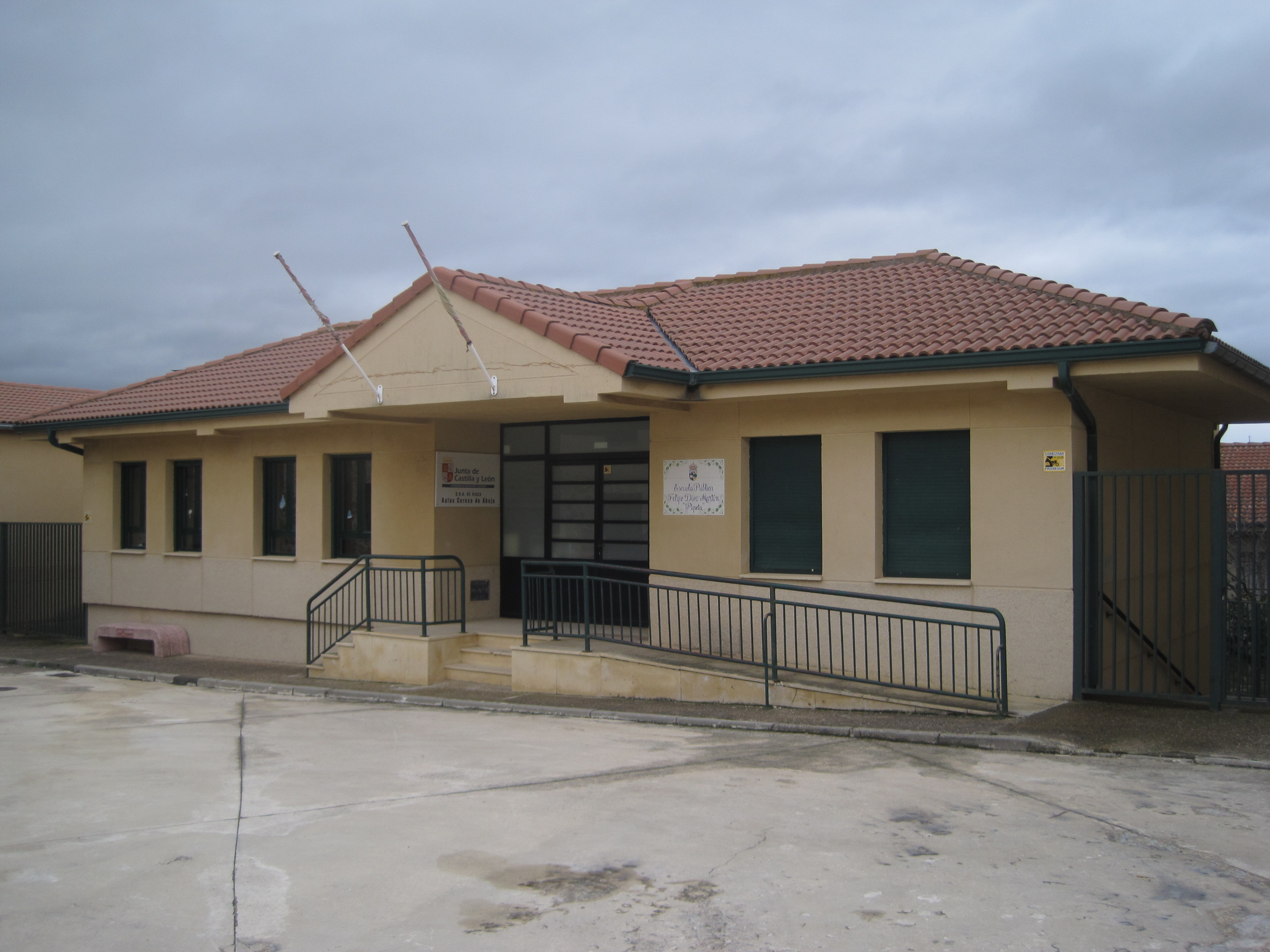
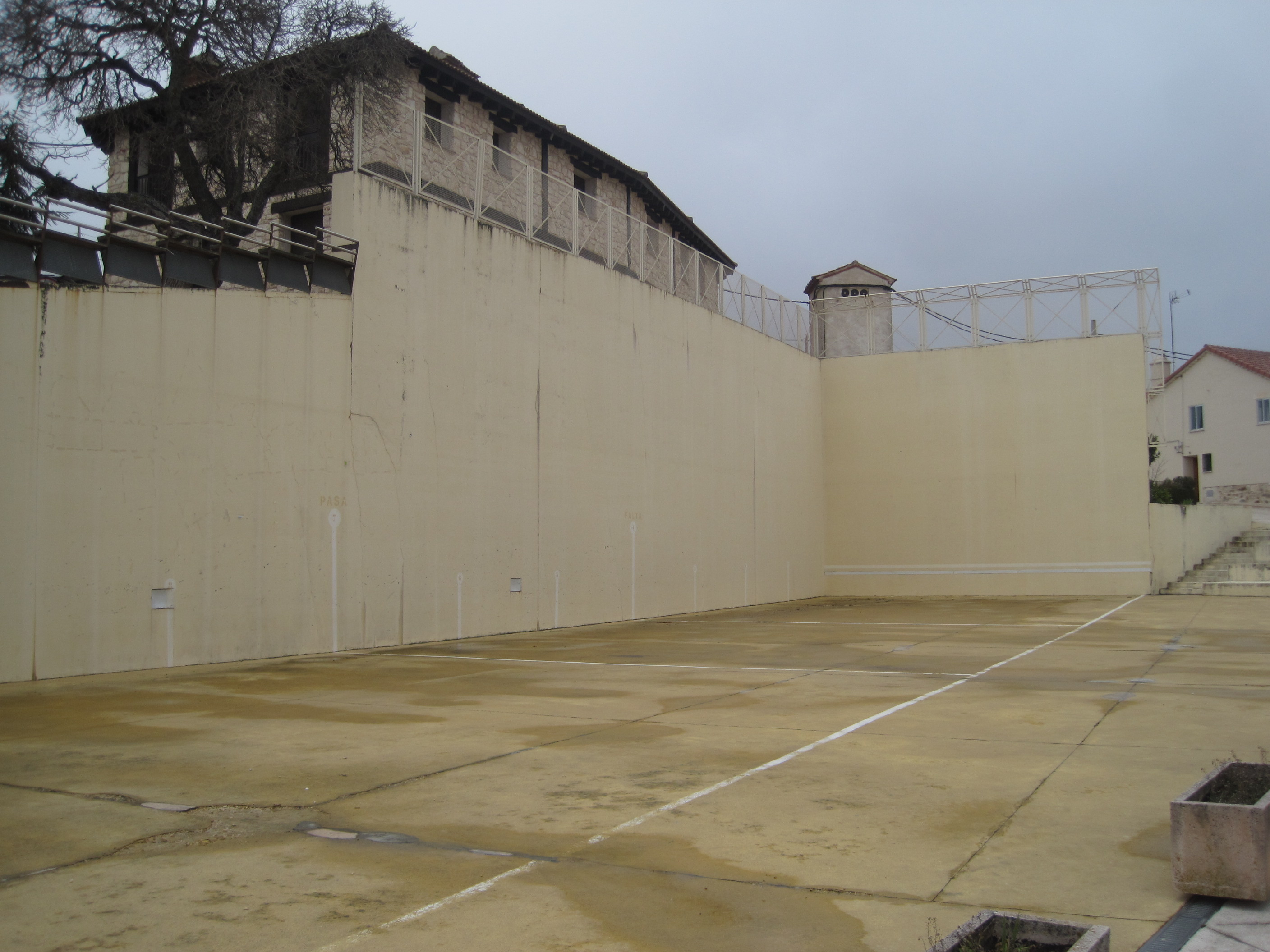
- Top: Church of San Román and Town Hall. Down: School and Frontón.

- Coat of arms

- Location in Spain. Cerezo de Abajo (Spain)
- Coordinates: 41°13′04″N 3°35′32″W
- Country: Spain
- Autonomous community: Castile and León
- Province: Segovia
- Comarca: Comunidad de Villa y Tierra de Sepúlveda

Government
  - Mayor: Felipe Martín Muñoz

Area
  - Total: 19.89 km^{2} (7.68 sq mi)
- Elevation: 1,046 m (3,432 ft)

Population (2025-01-01)
  - Total: 150
  - Density: 7.5/km^{2} (20/sq mi)
- Time zone: UTC+1 (CET)
  - Summer (DST): UTC+2 (CEST)
- Website: Official website

Cerezo de Abajo is a municipality located in the province of Segovia, Castile and León, Spain.

At the end of the Spanish Civil War it was the site of a Nationalist concentration camp housing more than 5,000 Republican prisoners.

== See also ==
- Cerezo de Arriba
