= Mohedas de Granadilla =

Mohedas de Granadilla, Spain
- municipality
- Flag Coat of arms
- Interactive map of Mohedas de Granadilla, Spain
- Coordinates: 40°16′N 6°12′W
- Country: Spain
- Autonomous community: Extremadura
- Province: Cáceres
- Municipality: Mohedas de Granadilla

Area
  - Total: 59 km^{2} (23 sq mi)
- Elevation: 450 m (1,480 ft)

Population (2025-01-01)
  - Total: 817
  - Density: 14/km^{2} (36/sq mi)
- Time zone: UTC+1 (CET)
  - Summer (DST): UTC+2 (CEST)

Mohedas de Granadilla is a municipality located in the province of Cáceres, Extremadura, Spain. According to the 2005 census (INE), the municipality has a population of 1061 inhabitants.

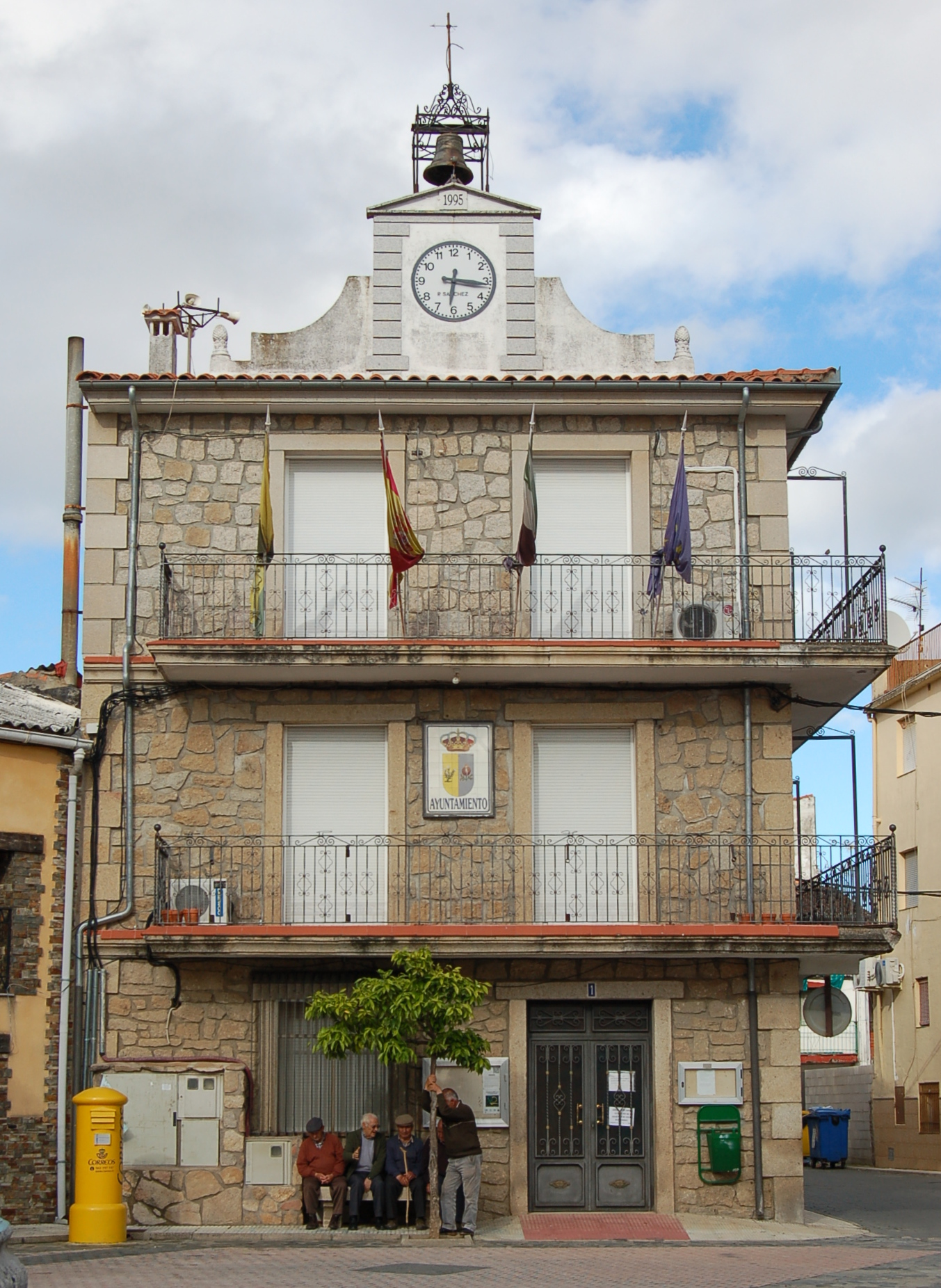
Mohedas de Granadilla Town Hall

== See also ==
- List of municipalities in Cáceres
