= Jarilla, Cáceres =

Municipality in Cáceres province, Extremadura, Spain

Jarilla
- municipality
- Coat of arms

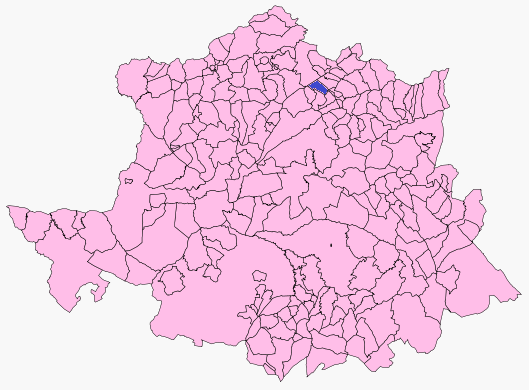
- Coordinates: 39°20′43″N 6°04′23″W
- Country: Spain
- Autonomous community: Extremadura
- Province: Cáceres
- Municipality: Jarilla

Area
  - Total: 28.47 km^{2} (10.99 sq mi)
- Elevation: 495 m (1,624 ft)

Population (2025-01-01)
  - Total: 127
- Time zone: UTC+1 (CET)
  - Summer (DST): UTC+2 (CEST)
- Postal code: 10728
- Website: www.jarilla.es

Jarilla is a municipality located in the province of Cáceres, Extremadura, Spain. According to the 2013 census (INE), the municipality has a population of 152 inhabitants.

== See also ==
- List of municipalities in Cáceres
