= Hervás =

Hervás Ervás
- Municipality
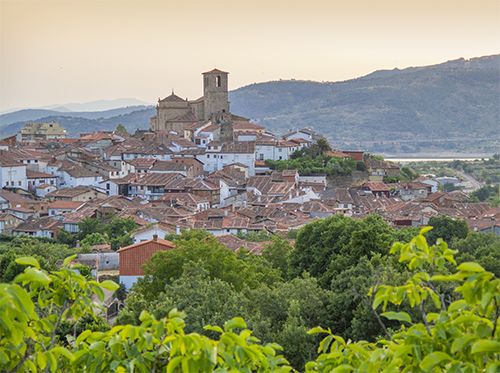
- View of Hervás

- Coat of arms

- Location in Extremadura Hervás (Spain)
- Coordinates: 40°16′26″N 5°51′57″W
- Country: Spain
- Autonomous Community: Extremadura
- Province: Cáceres
- Comarca: Valle del Ambroz

Government
  - Mayor: Gloria de los Santos Vizcaino Martín (People's Party)

Area
  - Total: 59.78 km^{2} (23.08 sq mi)
- Elevation (AMSL): 688 m (2,257 ft)

Population (2023)
  - Total: 3,907
  - Density: 65.36/km^{2} (169.3/sq mi)
- Time zone: UTC+1 (CET)
  - Summer (DST): UTC+2 (CEST (GMT +2))
- Postal code: 10700
- Area code: +34 (Spain) + 927 (Cáceres)
- Website: www.hervas.es

Hervás (Spanish pronunciation: [eɾˈβas]; Extremaduran: Ervás) is a Spanish town in the north of the province of Cáceres. It had 3,907 inhabitants in 2023. It is 120 km from Cáceres and 90 km far from Salamanca. It is the capital of the Valle de Ambroz comarca in the Ambroz River valley. It has a soft continental climate.

== History ==
In the 12th century, the Knights Templar built Santihervás hermitage under the patronage of the Christian martyrs Gervasius and Protasius. By this hermitage the town started to grow during 13th and 14th centuries.

From its foundation on it belonged to the lordship of Béjar in the Kingdom of Castile: it passed to Cáceres jurisdiction on the 30 November 1833. The city's civil and religious architecture has been declared an Asset of Cultural Interest since 1969.

=== La Judería ===
Many Jewish families settled here from the 15th century on. Some Jews remained in Hervas following their expulsion from Spain in 1492; although they officially converted to Christianity, they continued to practice Judaism in secrecy for a very long time. A proverb that is still common today in the area says that “in Hervás there are many Jews”. The Jewish quarter (Judería) of Hervas has been maintained and it is one of the main tourist attractions of the town.

== Economy ==
The textile industry was very important from the 18th to 19th centuries. After that, the chestnut wood industry, handicrafts and tourism have been the pillar of Hervás' economy.

== Remarkable buildings ==
- La Enfermería de los Religiosos Franciscanos (Franciscan Sickbay), 18th century, current town hall.
- El Convento de los Religiosos Trinitarios (Trinitarian Convent), current Junta de Extremadura Hospedería (chain of four-star hotels run by the regional government).
- Pérez Comendador-Leroux Museum, 18th century.
- La Iglesia Parroquial de Santa María (Saint Mary's Parish Church).
- Museo de la Cereza del Jerte (cereza con denominación de origen Valle del Jerte). Hospederia Valle del Jerte.
- Plasencia, la perla del Valle del Jerte

== See also ==
- List of municipalities in Cáceres
