= Segura de Toro =

Coordinates: 40°13′N 5°57′W

- Coat of arms

- Location in Spain.
- Country: Spain
- Autonomous community: Cáceres

Area
  - Total: 15.36 km^{2} (5.93 sq mi)
- Elevation: 636 m (2,087 ft)

Population (2025-01-01)
  - Total: 190
  - Density: 12/km^{2} (32/sq mi)
- Time zone: UTC+1 (CET)
  - Summer (DST): UTC+2 (CEST)
- Website: www.seguradetoro.es

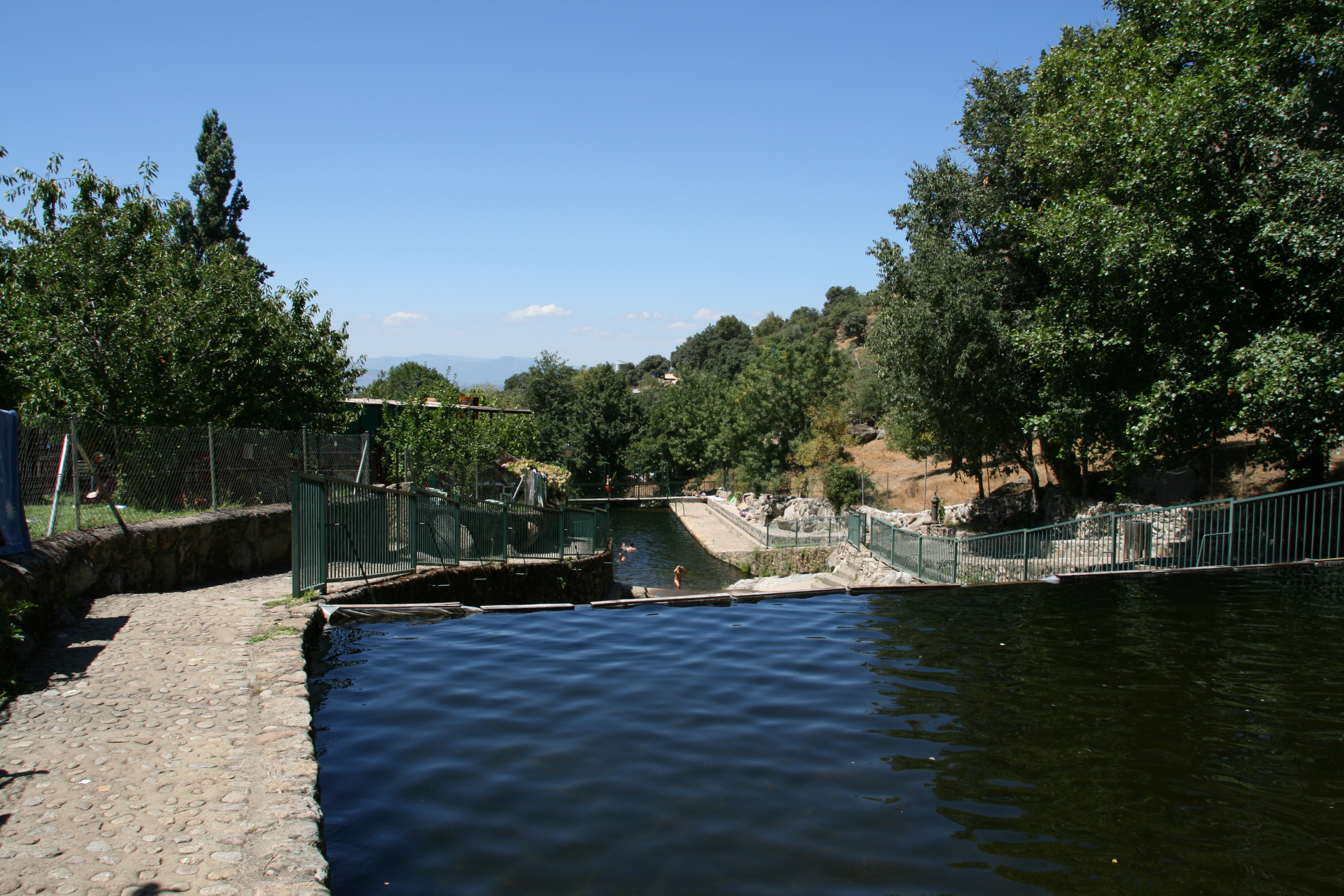
The Natural pools in the Garganta Grande river, in Segura de Toro

Segura de Toro is a Spanish village in the north of the province of Cáceres. There are some Celtic remains which can indicate a possible Celtic origin. It is situated by the Tras la Sierra mountains at an altitude of 715 m. It has several streams, and the main one being Garganta Ancha. The village has a Mediterranean climate and its pluviosity is 986.4 m/m. It is built on a granite formation and there are chestnuts and oaks surrounded by tree heaths and genista.

== Demography ==
24.3% of the population is elderly. The population peaked in 1951. There were 193 inhabitants as of 2005.

== See also ==
- List of municipalities in Cáceres
