= Vía de la Plata =

Ancient road route in Spain

Route of the Silver Way

The Vía de La Plata (Silver Way) or Ruta de la Plata (Silver Route) is an ancient commercial and pilgrimage path that crosses the west of Spain from north to south, connecting Mérida to Astorga. An extended form begins further south in Seville and reaches north to the Bay of Biscay at Gijón. The path is used by the modern A-66 and AP-66 freeways, as well as by the older N-630 national road.

== Name ==
The term Vía de la Plata is commonly thought to derive from the modern Spanish word for silver, plata. The name actually derives from the Arabic word al-balat, which means cobbled paving and described the road as engineered by the Romans.

The Silver Route, despite its name, was never a road for the circulation of silver trade. Such denomination is due, as in other occasions, to a popular evolution due to a phonetic confusion. In the Andalusian period, this route was called al-Balat (the paved road), a word very frequent in other areas of Spain and the origin of place names such as Albalat and Albalate. It is possible that this pronunciation led people to transfer the sound to that of the precious metal, and that is why it began to be called the Via de la Plata on an indeterminate date, but before 1504 and 1507, when it was first documented with Christopher Columbus and Antonio de Nebrija, respectively. In the first it appears simply as the Plata and in the second in this form:

Est praeterea eiusdem Lusitanie via nobilissima: Argentea vulgo dicitur. Quod Licinius pontifex primum stravit, deinde Traianus Caesar refecit, et deinceps Aelius Pertinax aliiqui imperatores restituerunt, id quod ex lapidibus intelligitur: quibus millia passuum distinguuntur.

The path is from Emerita Augusta to Castra Caecilia Salmanticam usque, ubi primum in extima pontis parte incipit evanescere, neque ulterius ullum viae illius vestigium cernit. Another hypothesis about the name is that it could have come from a late via Delapidata, even though it poses some problems, such as the absence on this road of real silices or stones, i.e., cobblestones, which were not usual on non-urban roads. To solve this difficulty, a new hypothesis explains the meaning of the last via delapidata as "a road marked with milestones" (from the classical and medieval Latin lapis, "milestone").

== Pre-Roman era ==
The historical origin of this communication route is uncertain. During the protohistoric period, coinciding with the presence of the Tartessos culture in the south of the peninsula, there are reports of the existence of commercial contacts with the Hispanic west thanks to various archaeological discoveries, along a route known by some scholars as the "Via del Estaño", since it is assumed that a large part of this metal would circulate in the peninsula.

In the following centuries it continued to be frequented, without its specific name being known, becoming, until the arrival of Rome, one of the main routes of communication of the Hispanic towns next to the so-called Via Heraclea, which ran through the whole of the Levant, from Cadiz to cross the Pyrenees.

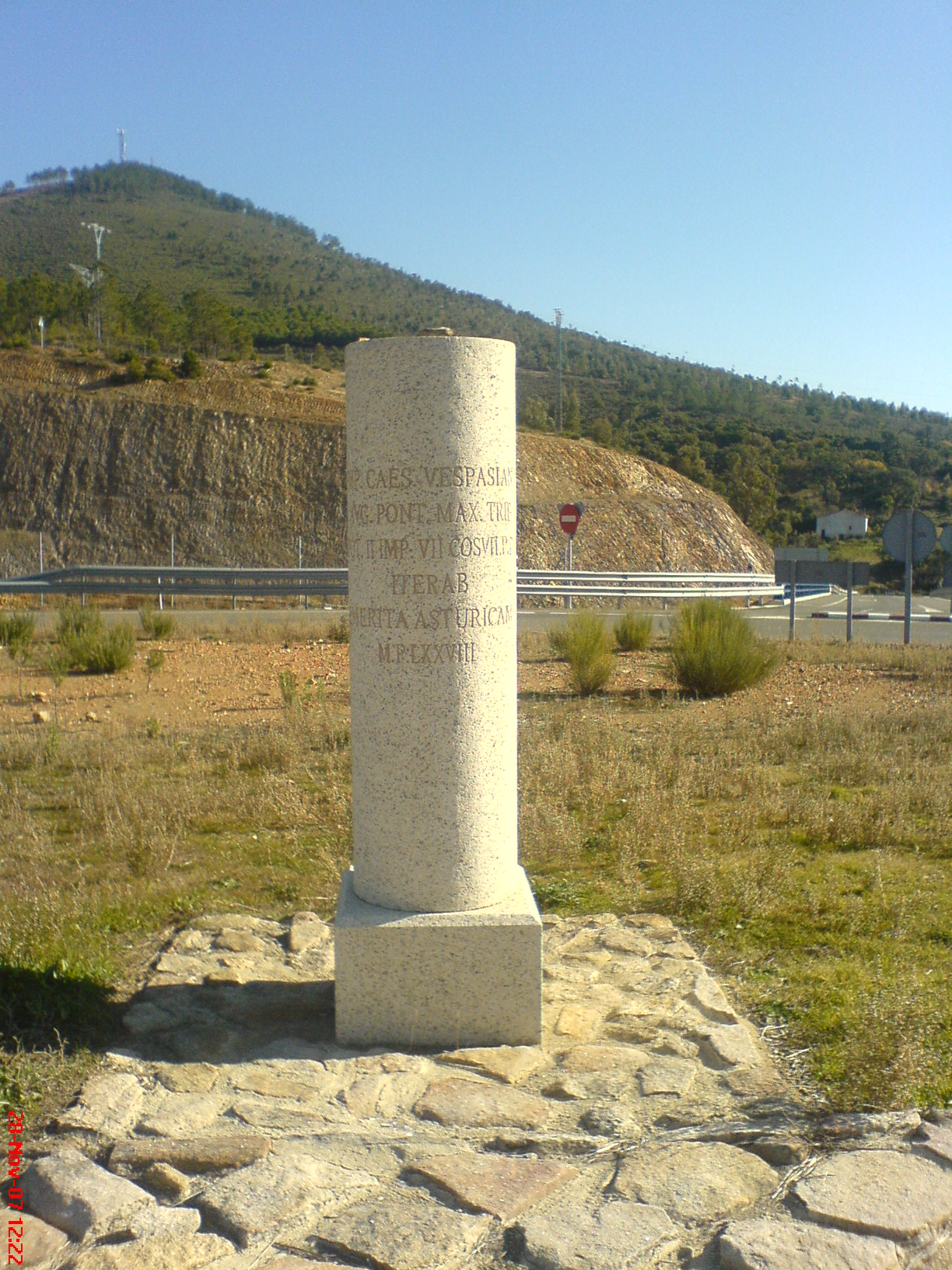
Modern marker at Puerto de los Castaños. Back.

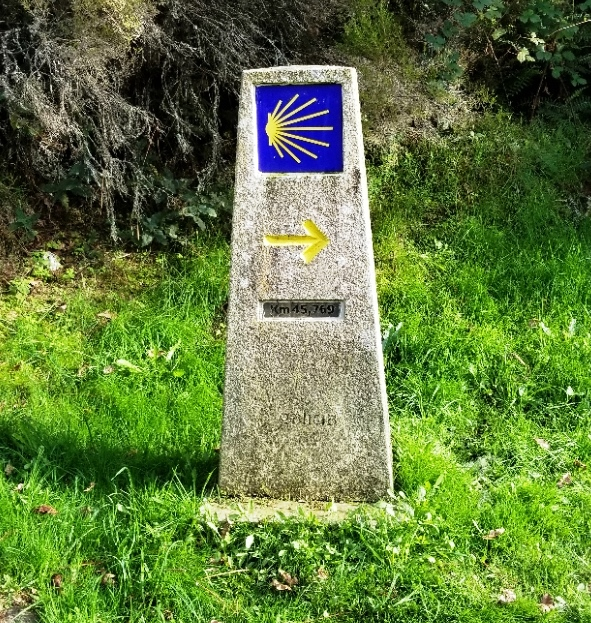
Marker of the Camino de Santiago near the medieval Taboada Bridge in the Vía de la Plata.

== Modern times ==
The suitability of the route's layout is demonstrated even today. It is used by modern A-66 and AP-66 freeways as well as by older N-630 national road. Some stretches, however, pass through urban areas like Seville, where the Vía de la Plata runs along the Guadalquivir. The Vía de la Plata has become increasingly popular as an alternative to the French Way for pilgrims walking, cycling, or riding to Santiago de Compostela. Large sections are more or less the same as they were two thousand years ago.

The official Pilgrim's office publishes statistics regarding pilgrims who got the certificate. In 2024 about 9,000 pilgrims finished the Silver Route. It was the seventh most popular route with 1.8%. Most pilgrims are Spanish (58%), followed by Portuguese (8.3%), Italians (5%) and Germans (3.8%). Most people started in Ourense (50%), Seville (21%) and Salamanca (3.8%). 84% did the journey on foot and 14% on a bike. Nine pilgrims travelled on a horse and one in a wheelchair. Most people arrive from this route in Santiago in May and July.

== See also ==
- Camino de Santiago
