= Aldeanueva del Camino =

Coordinates: 40°16′N 5°55′W

Aldeanueva del Camino, Spain
- municipality
- Flag Coat of arms
- Interactive map of Aldeanueva del Camino, Spain
- Country: Spain
- Autonomous community: Extremadura
- Province: Cáceres
- Municipality: Aldeanueva del Camino

Area
  - Total: 20 km^{2} (7.7 sq mi)

Population (2025-01-01)
  - Total: 696
  - Density: 35/km^{2} (90/sq mi)
- Time zone: UTC+1 (CET)
  - Summer (DST): UTC+2 (CEST)

Aldeanueva del Camino is a municipality located in the province of Cáceres, Extremadura, Spain. According to the 2006 census (INE), the municipality has a population of 830 inhabitants.

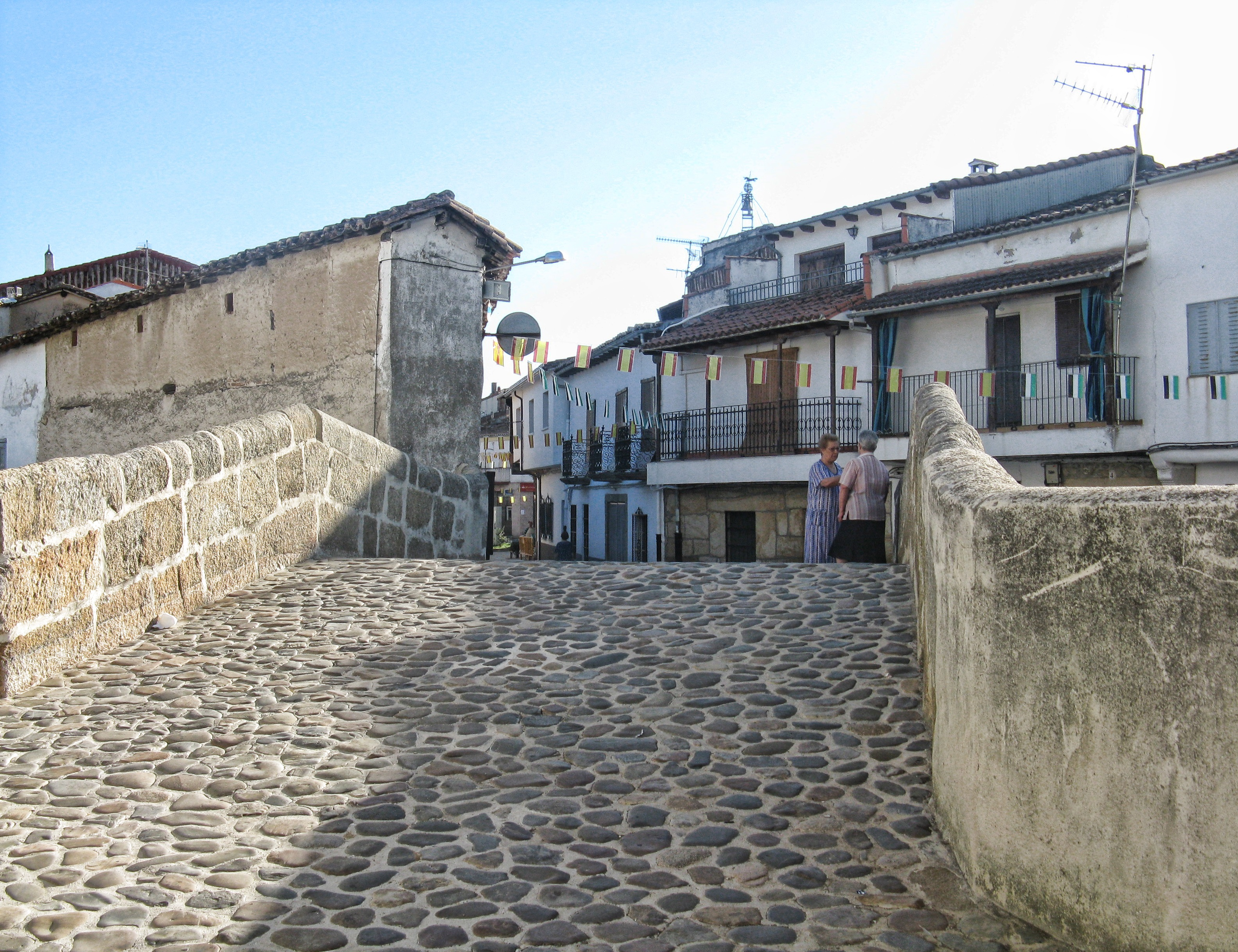
Masides Street, Aldeanueva del Camino, Cáceres province, Spain

== See also ==
- List of municipalities in Cáceres
