= Casas del Monte =

Coordinates: 40°12′00″N 5°57′00″W

Casas del Monte, Spain
- municipality
- Coat of arms
- Interactive map of Casas del Monte, Spain
- Country: Spain
- Autonomous community: Extremadura
- Province: Cáceres
- Municipality: Casas del Monte

Area
  - Total: 27 km^{2} (10 sq mi)

Population (2025-01-01)
  - Total: 761
  - Density: 28/km^{2} (73/sq mi)
- Time zone: UTC+1 (CET)
  - Summer (DST): UTC+2 (CEST)
- Website: http://www.casasdelmonte.com

Casas del Monte is a municipality located in the province of Cáceres, Extremadura, Spain. According to the 2006 census (INE), the municipality has a population of 850 inhabitants.

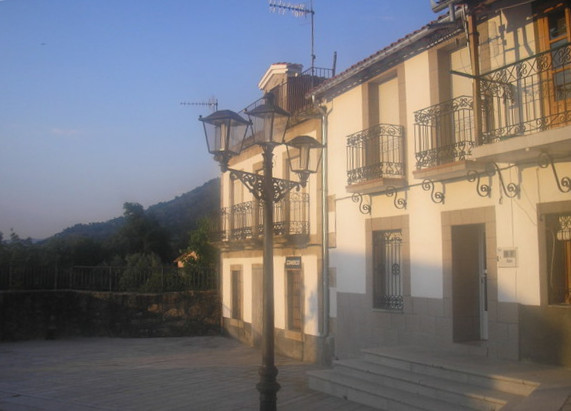
Casas del Monte Square

== See also ==
- List of municipalities in Cáceres
