= Abadía =

Coordinates: 40.2601°N 5.977°W

- Flag Coat of arms

- Location in Spain.
- Country: Spain
- Autonomous community: Cáceres

Area
  - Total: 45.08 km^{2} (17.41 sq mi)
- Elevation: 453 m (1,486 ft)

Population (2025-01-01)
  - Total: 337
  - Density: 7.48/km^{2} (19.4/sq mi)
- Time zone: UTC+1 (CET)
  - Summer (DST): UTC+2 (CEST)
- Website: www.abadia.es

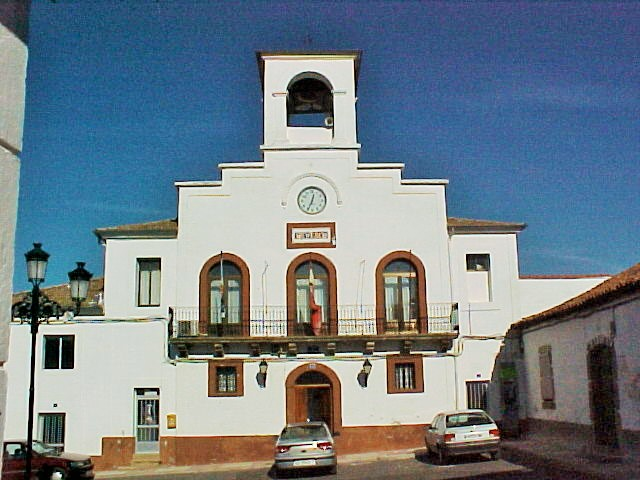
Abadía Local Council

Abadía (Spanish pronunciation: [a.βaˈði.a]) is a Spanish municipality located at an altitude of 442 metres above sea-level in the Autonomous Community of Estremadura, province of Cáceres. In 2001 its population was 272 – c. 6 people per square kilometre within an area of 45 km^{2} (17 sq mi).

== Etymology ==
It name is due to the abandoned Abbey next to the town.

== See also ==
- List of municipalities in Cáceres
