= La Vera =

Coordinates: 40°05′55″N 5°40′50″W

- Comarca
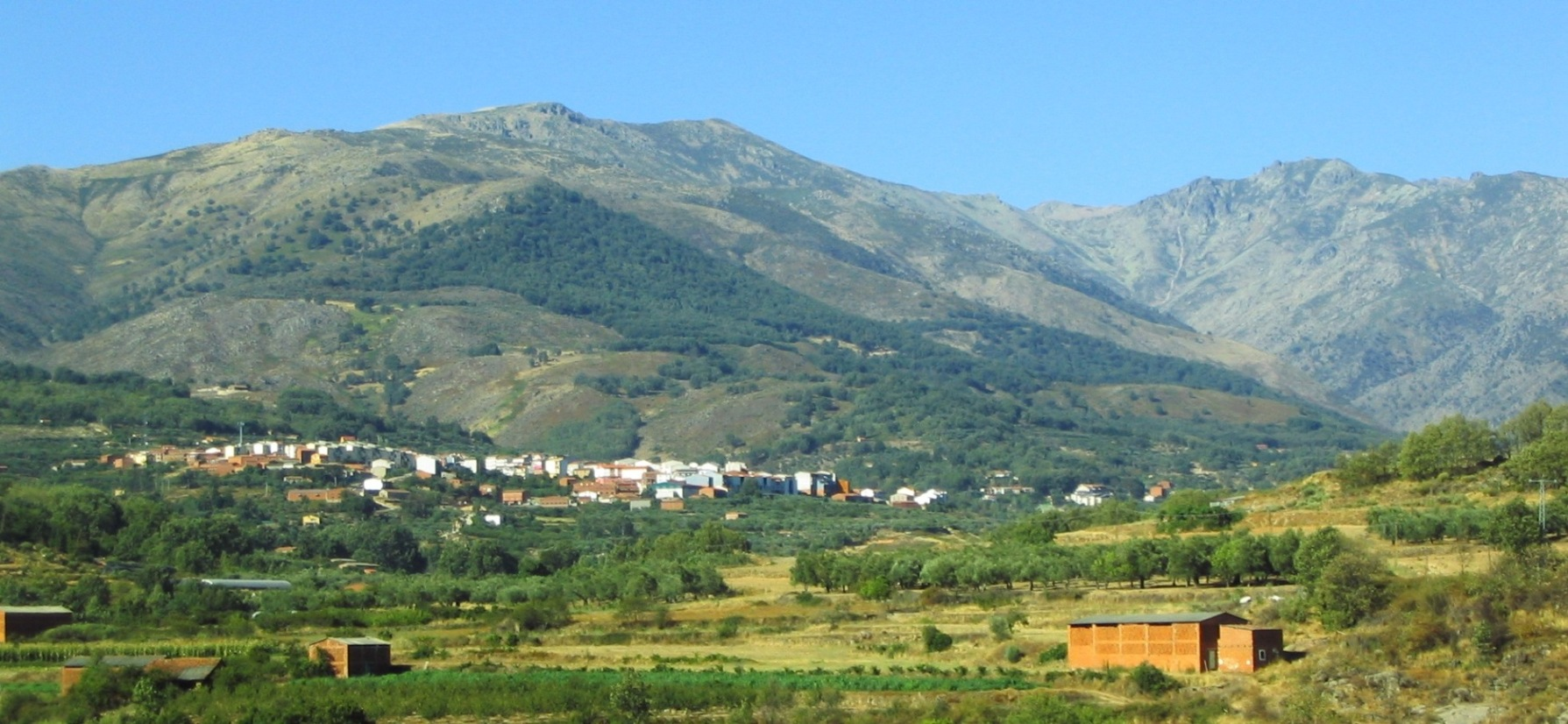
- View of Aldeanueva de la Vera at the feet of the Sierra de Gredos.

- Country: Spain
- Autonomous community: Extremadura
- Province: Cáceres
- Capital: Jaraíz de la Vera
- Municipalities: List: Aldeanueva de la Vera, Arroyomolinos de la Vera, Collado de la Vera, Cuacos de Yuste, Garganta la Olla, Gargüera de la Vera, Guijo de Santa Bárbara, Jaraíz de la Vera, Jarandilla de la Vera, Losar de la Vera, Madrigal de la Vera, Pasarón de la Vera, Robledillo de la Vera, Talaveruela de la Vera, Tejeda de Tiétar, Torremenga, Valverde de la Vera, Viandar de la Vera, Villanueva de la Vera

Area
  - Total: 888 km^{2} (343 sq mi)

Population (2009)
  - Total: 26,104
  - Density: 29.4/km^{2} (76.1/sq mi)
- Time zone: UTC+1 (CET)
  - Summer (DST): UTC+2 (CEST)

La Vera is a comarca (county, but with no administrative role) in Extremadura, western Spain. The largest town is Jaraíz de la Vera.

Located at the feet of the Sierra de Gredos mountain range, in the Tiétar river valley, the comarca is economically based on agriculture. It is the home of the highly sought-after Pimentón de la Vera, which has achieved "Protected Denomination of Origin" status.
