= The Sentence (upcoming film) =

- Spanish: Los relatos
- Directed by: Miguel del Arco
- Written by: Miguel del Arco
- Produced by: Pedro Hernández Santos; Roberto Butragueño
- Starring: Juan Diego Botto; Marta Etura; Ainara Elejalde
- Production companies: Aquí y Allí Films; Sideral; 3040 Cine; Kamikaze Producciones; Avanpost Media
- Distributed by: Sideral Cinema
- Release date: 2026
- Countries: Spain; Romania
- Language: Spanish

The Sentence (Spanish: Los relatos) is an upcoming drama film directed by Miguel del Arco. It stars Juan Diego Botto alongside Marta Etura and Ainara Elejalde.

== Plot ==
After serving a prison sentence for a femicide and coinciding with the publication of his biography, Pablo returns to his hometown twenty years after the lurid event, piquing the curiosity of the locals and reopening past wounds.

== Cast ==
- Juan Diego Botto as Pablo
- Marta Etura
- Ainara Elejalde

== Production ==
The film was produced by Aquí y Allí Films and Sideral along with 3040 Cine, Kamikaze Producciones, and Avanpost with backing from Movistar Plus+, Telemadrid, ICAA, Junta de Extremadura, and the Madrid regional administration. Principal photography started on 8 September 2025. It was shot in between Madrid and La Vera (Madrigal de la Vera, Jarandilla de la Vera, Talaveruela de la Vera, and Valverde de la Vera).

== Release ==
Sideral secured Spanish distribution rights and international sales. The release is expected for late 2026.

== See also ==
- List of Spanish films of 2026
