= Gunpowder artillery in the Middle Ages =

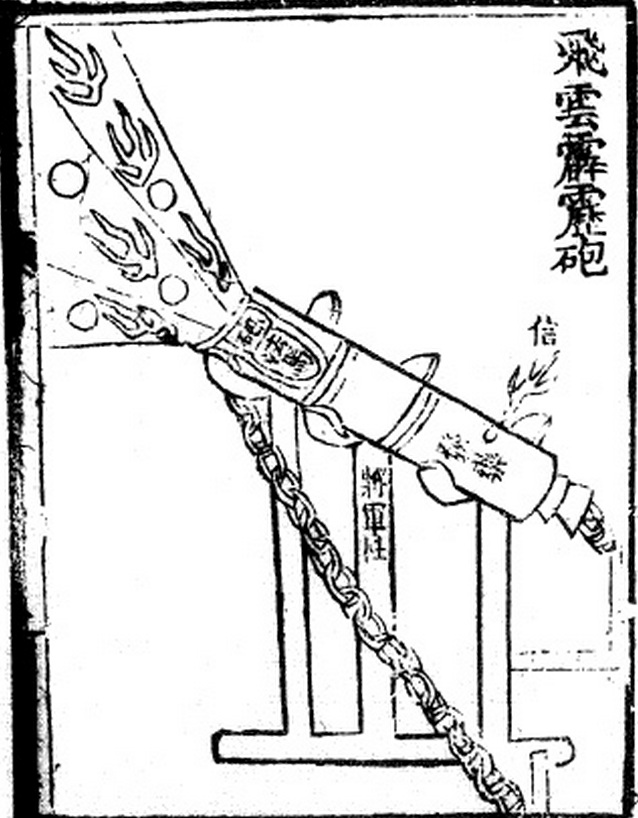
An illustration of an "eruptor," a proto-cannon, from the 14th-century Ming dynasty book Huolongjing. The cannon was capable of firing proto-shells, cast-iron bombs filled with gunpowder.

Gunpowder artillery in the Middle Ages primarily consisted of the introduction of the cannon, large tubular firearms designed to fire a heavy projectile over a long distance. Guns, bombs, rockets and cannons were first invented in China during the Han and Song dynasties and then later spread to Europe and the Middle East during the period.

Although gunpowder was known in Europe during the High Middle Ages due to the usage of guns and explosives by the Mongols and the Chinese firearms experts employed by them as mercenaries during the Mongol conquests of Europe, it was not until the Late Middle Ages that European versions of cannons were widely developed. Their use was also first documented in the Middle East around this time. English cannons first appeared in 1327, and later saw more general use during the Hundred Years' War, when primitive cannons were employed at the Battle of Crécy in 1346. By the end of the 14th century, the use of cannons was also recorded as being used by the Swedes, Poles, Russians, Byzantines and Ottomans.

The earliest medieval cannon, the pot-de-fer, had a bulbous, vase-like shape, and was used more for psychological effect than physical damage. The later culverin was transitional between the handgun and the full cannon, and was used as an anti-personnel weapon. During the 15th century, cannons advanced significantly, so that bombards were effective siege engines. Towards the end of the period, the cannon gradually replaced siege engines—among other forms of aging weaponry—on the battlefield.

The Middle English word Canon was derived from the Tuscan word cannone, meaning large tube, which came from Latin canna, meaning cane or reed. The Latinised word canon has been used for a gun since 1326 in Italy, and since 1418 in English. The word Bombardum, or "bombard", was the earliest term used for "cannon", but from 1430 it came to refer only to the largest weapons.

== Early use in China and East Asia ==
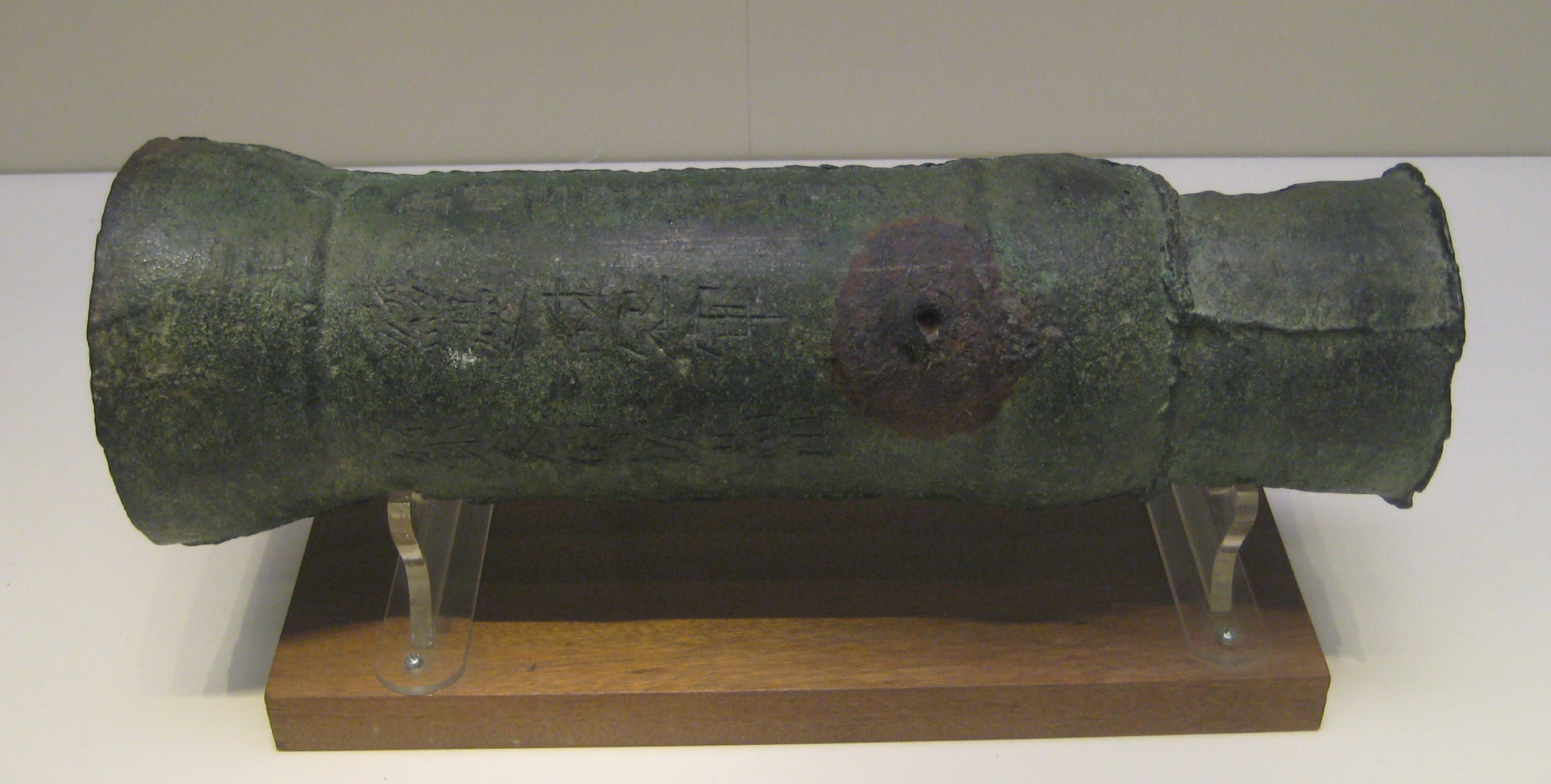
Bronze cannon with an inscription dated the 3rd year of the Zhiyuan era (1332) of the Yuan dynasty (1271–1368); it was discovered at the Yunju Temple of Fangshan District, Beijing, China in 1935.

The first documented battlefield use of gunpowder artillery took place on 29 January 1132, when Song General Han Shizhong used huochong to capture a city in Fujian. The world's earliest known hand cannon is the Heilongjiang hand cannon dated 1288, which was found in Mongol-held Manchuria. In his 1341 poem, The Iron Cannon Affair, one of the first accounts of the use of gunpowder artillery in China, Xian Zhang wrote that a cannonball fired from an eruptor could "pierce the heart or belly when it strikes a man or horse, and can even transfix several persons at once."

== Use in the Islamic world ==
The Arabs acquired knowledge of gunpowder between 1240 and 1280, by which time there were written Arabic recipes for gunpowder, instructions for the purification of saltpeter, and descriptions of gunpowder incendiaries.

Ahmad Y. al-Hassan claims that in the Battle of Ain Jalut in 1260 against the Mongols, the Mamluks used "the first cannon in history" gunpowder formulae which were almost identical with the ideal composition for explosive gunpowder, which he claims were not known in China or Europe until much later. However, Iqtidar Alam Khan states that it was invading Mongols who introduced gunpowder to the Islamic world and cites Mamluk antagonism towards early riflemen in their infantry as an example of how gunpowder weapons were not always met with open acceptance in the Middle East.

Al-Hassan interprets Ibn Khaldun as reporting the use of cannon as siege machines by the Marinid sultan Abu Yaqub Yusuf at the siege of Sijilmasa in 1274. Super-sized bombards were used by the troops of Mehmed II to capture Constantinople, in 1453. Urban, a Hungarian cannon engineer, is credited with the introduction of this cannon from Central Europe to the Ottoman realm. It could fire heavy stone balls a mile, and the sound of its blast could reportedly be heard from a distance of 10 miles (16 km). A piece of slightly later date (see pic) was cast in bronze and made in two parts: the chase and the breech, which, together, weighed 18.4 tonnes. The two parts were screwed together using levers to facilitate the work.

=== Africa ===
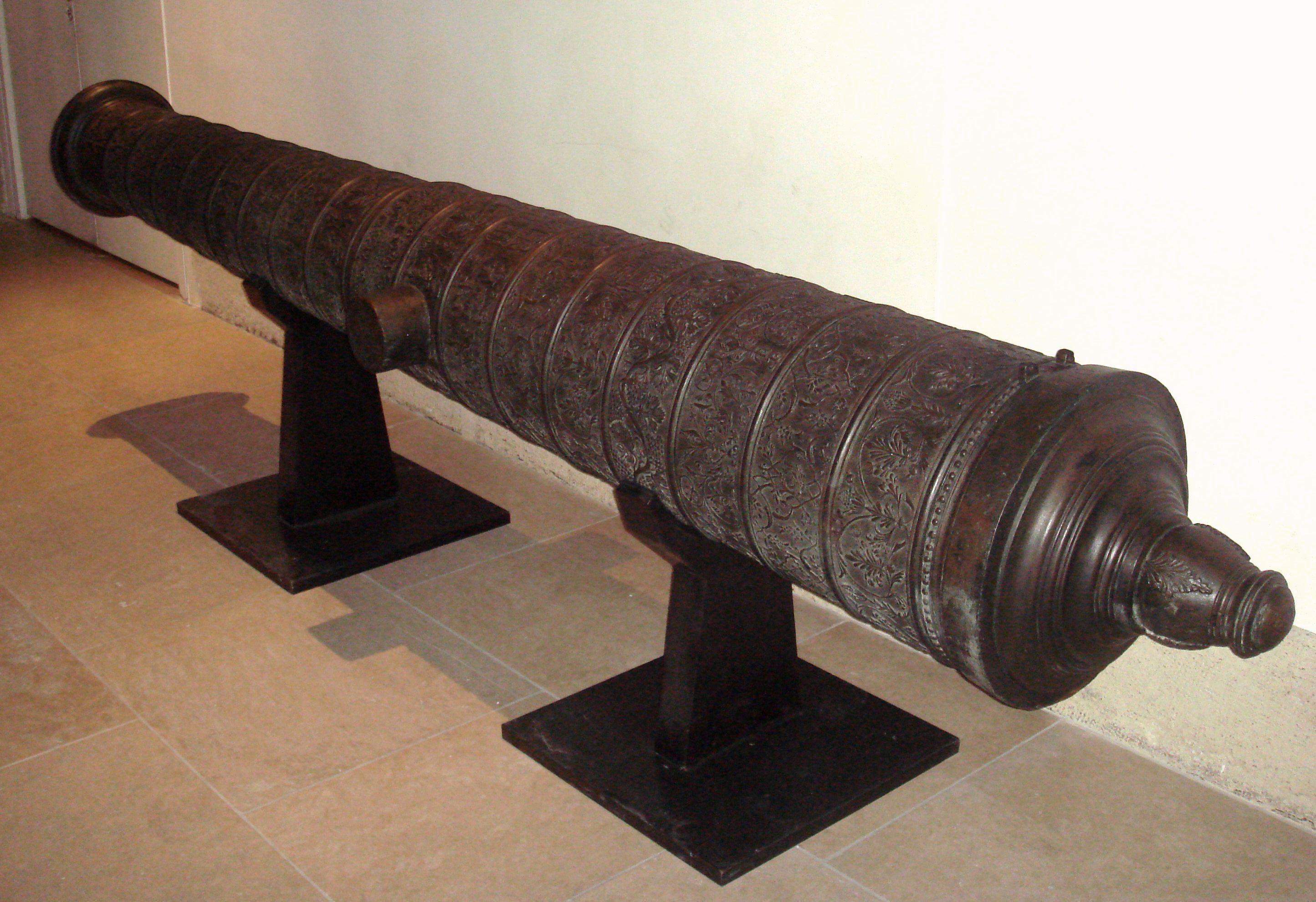
Adal pioneered the use of cannon in Africa during its conquest of Abyssinia.

In Africa, the Adal Empire and the Abyssinian Empire both deployed cannons during the Adal-Abyssinian War. The Adalites, led by Ahmed ibn Ibrahim al-Ghazi, were the first African power to introduce cannon imported from Arabia and the wider Islamic world. Later on, the Portuguese Empire entered the war, and provided the Abyssinians with cannons, while the Ottoman Empire sent soldiers and cannons to back Adal. The conflict proved, through their use on both sides, the advantage of firearms such as the matchlock musket, cannons, and the arquebus over traditional weapons.

== Use in Europe ==
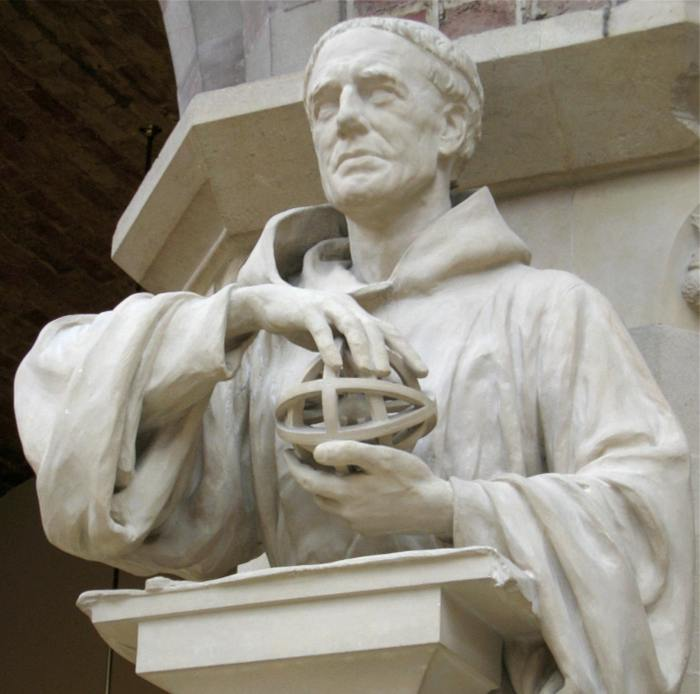
Roger Bacon described the first gunpowder in Europe.

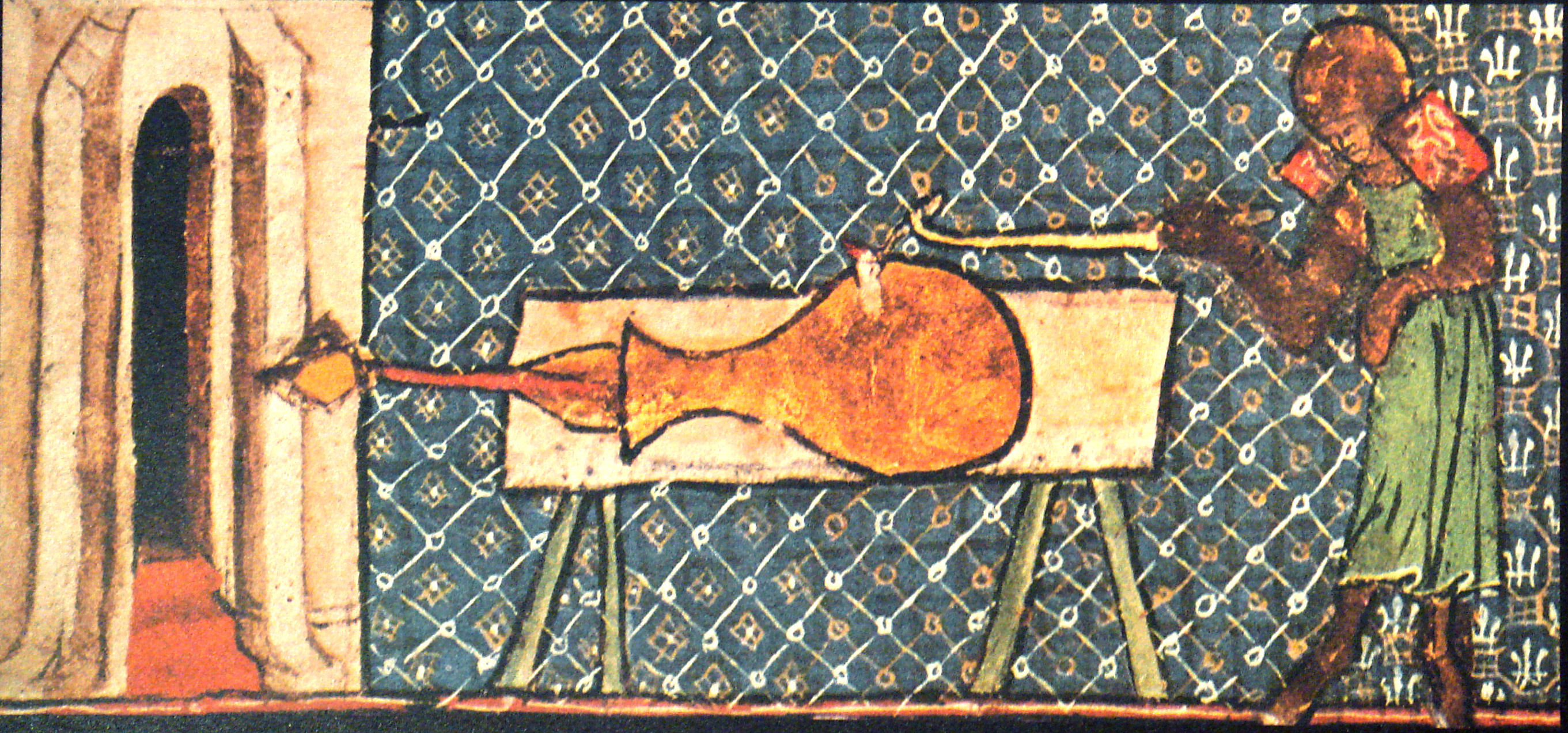
"Vaso", the earliest illustration of a European cannon, from around 1327, by Walter de Milemete

In Europe, one of the earliest mentions of gunpowder appeared in Roger Bacon's Opus Majus in 1267. It describes a recipe for gunpowder and recognized its military use:

We can, with saltpeter and other substances, compose artificially a fire that can be launched over long distances ... By only using a very small quantity of this material much light can be created accompanied by a horrible fracas. It is possible with it to destroy a town or an army ... In order to produce this artificial lightning and thunder it is necessary to take saltpeter, sulfur, and Luru Vopo Vir Can Utriet.

In 1250, the Norwegian Konungs skuggsjá mentioned, in its military chapter, the use of "coal and sulphur" as the best weapon for ship-to-ship combat.

=== Italy ===
Probably one of the oldest European firearms was the 1322 bronze vase-shaped gun from Mantua, of which drawings and measurements made in 1786 before it disappeared in 1849. It was 16.4 cm long, weighed about 5 kg and had a caliber of 5.5 cm. The first document that mentions the use of cannons in Italy (and also in Europe) comes from a register of the municipality of Florence dated 1326 and attests, in that year, the purchase by the municipality of iron bullets and cannons. The following year, some cannons are also documented in the castle of Gassino, near Turin and, in 1335, the presence of firearms is also attested in Venice. However, it was only around 1340 that the use of cannons began to become more frequent and they were no longer only used to defend castles and cities, but also to besiege them, as the Visconti did in 1351 during the siege of Conselice, near Bologna.

=== Muslim and Christian Iberia ===
In reference to the siege to Alicante in 1331, the Spanish historian Zurita recorded a "new machine that caused great terror. It threw iron balls with fire." The Spanish historian Juan de Mariana recalled further use of cannons during the Siege of Algeciras (1342-1344):

The besieged did great harm among the Christians with iron bullets they shot. This is the first time we find any mention of gunpowder and ball in our histories.

Juan de Mariana also relates that the English Earl of Derby and Earl of Salisbury had both participated in the siege of Algeciras, and they could have conceivably transferred the knowledge about the effectiveness of cannon to England.

The Iberian kings at the initial stages enlisted the help of Moorish experts:

The first artillery-masters on the Peninsula probably were Moors in Christian service. The king of Navarre had a Moor in his service in 1367 as maestro de las guarniciones de artilleria. The Morisques of Tudela at that time had fame for their capacity in reparaciones de artilleria.

=== Britain and France ===
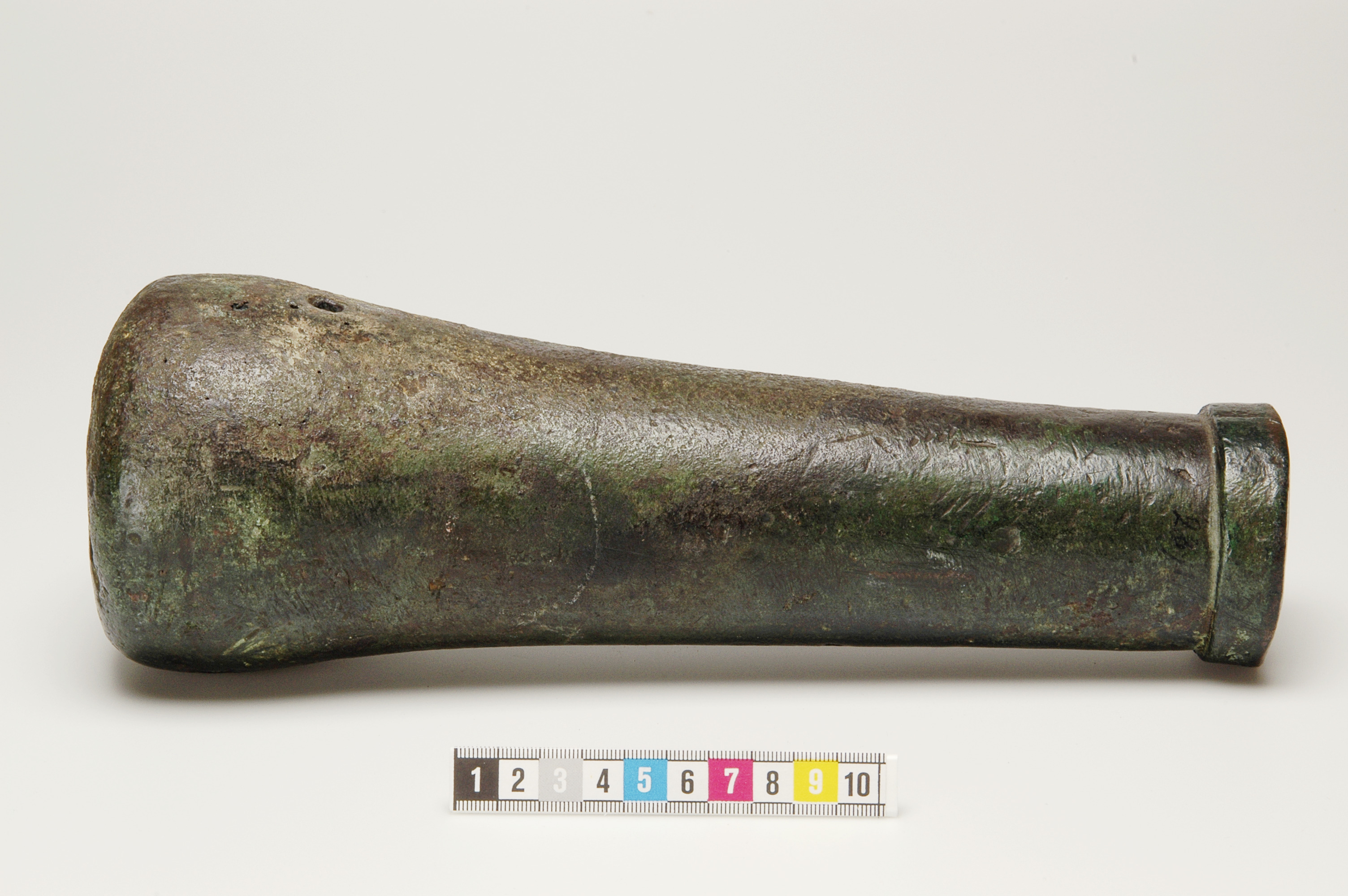
Pot-de-fer from Loshult, Sweden

Cannon seem to have been introduced to the Kingdom of England in the 14th century, and are mentioned as being in use against the Scots in 1327. The first metal cannon was the pot-de-fer, first depicted in an illuminated manuscript by Walter de Milamete, of 1327 that was presented to Edward III upon his accession to the English throne. The manuscript shows a four-legged stand supporting a "bulbous bottle", while the gunner stands well back, firing the charge with a red-hot iron bar. A bolt protrudes from the muzzle, but no wad is shown. Although illustrated in the treatise, no explanation or description was given.

This weapon, and others similar, were used by both the French and English during the Hundred Years' War (1337–1453), when cannon saw their first real use on the European battlefield. The cannon of the 14th century were still limited in many respects, as a modern historian summarises:

Early cannon were inferior in every respect to the great siege-engines: they were slow and small, they were limited… [in the 14th century] to firing bolts or 'garrots' and they had a very limited range. The weaknesses were due to limited technology: inability to forge or cast in one piece or make iron balls. They were probably as dangerous to their users as to the enemy and affected the morale of men (and horses) rather than damaged persons or buildings.

During the 1340s, cannon were still relatively rare, and were only used in small numbers by a few states. "Ribaldis" were first mentioned in the English Privy Wardrobe accounts during preparations for the Battle of Crécy between 1345 and 1346. These were believed to have shot large arrows and simple grapeshot, but they were so important they were directly controlled by the Royal Wardrobe. According to the contemporary chronicler Jean Froissart, the English cannon made "two or three discharges on the Genoese", which is taken to mean individual shots by two or three guns because of the time taken to reload such primitive artillery. The Florentine Giovanni Villani agreed that they were destructive on the field, though he also indicated that the guns continued to fire upon French cavalry later in the battle:

The English guns cast iron balls by means of fire… They made a noise like thunder and caused much loss in men and horses… The Genoese were continually hit by the archers and the gunners… [by the end of the battle] the whole plain was covered by men struck down by arrows and cannon balls.

== Advances in the Late Middle Ages ==
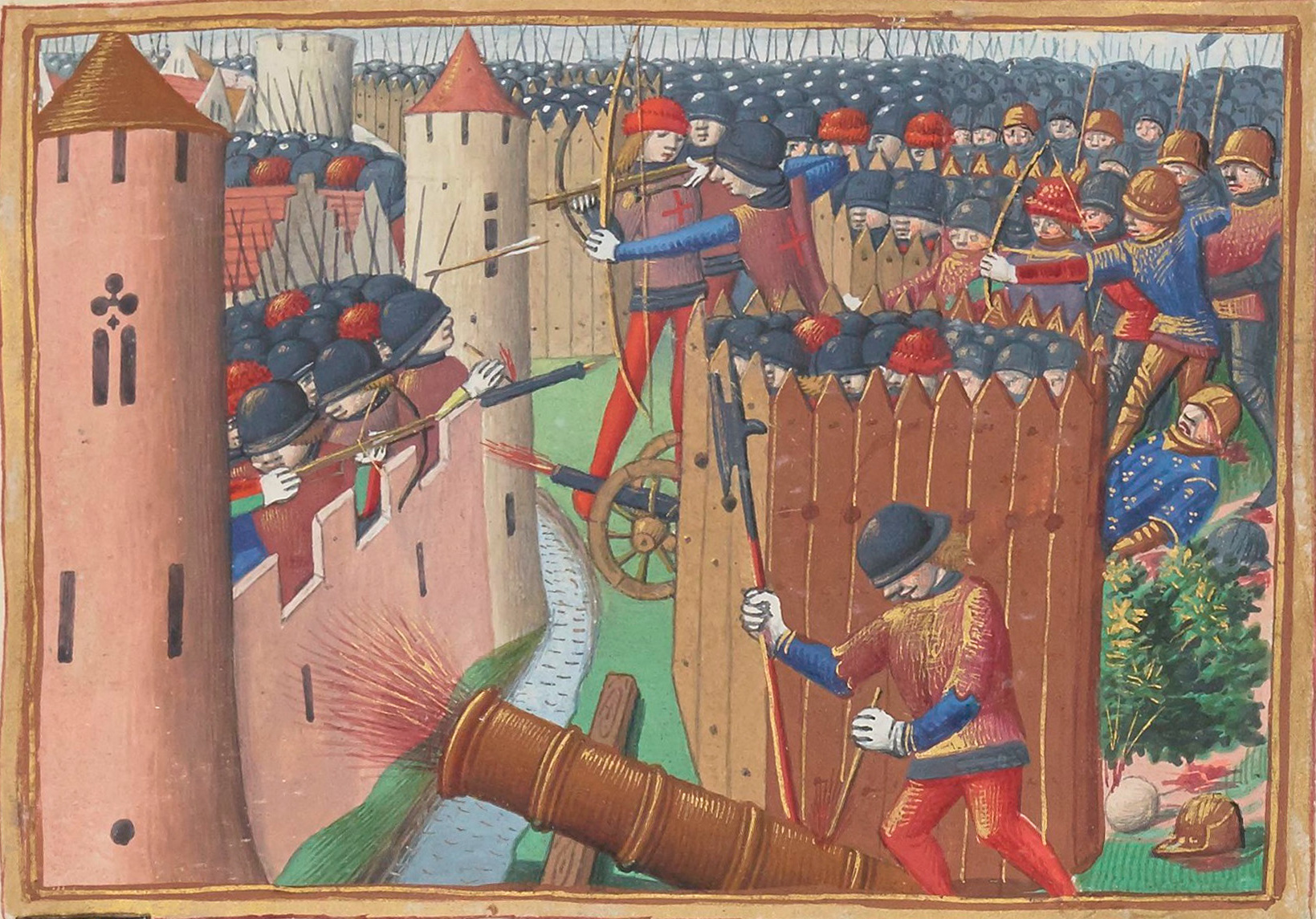
Depiction of artillery in an illustration of the Siege of Orléans of 1429 (Martial d'Auvergne, 1493)

Similar cannon to those used at Crécy appeared also at the Siege of Calais in the same year, and by the 1380s the "ribaudekin" clearly became mounted on wheels. Wheeled gun carriages became more commonplace by the end of the 15th century, and guns were more often cast in bronze, rather than banding iron sections together. There were still the logistical problems both of transporting and of operating the cannon, and as many three dozen horses and oxen may have been required to move some of the great guns of the period.

Another small-bore cannon of the 14th century was the culverin, whose name derives from the snake-like handles attached to it. It was transitional between the handgun and the full cannon, and was used as an anti-personnel weapon. The culverin was forged of iron and fixed to a wooden stock, and usually placed on a rest for firing.

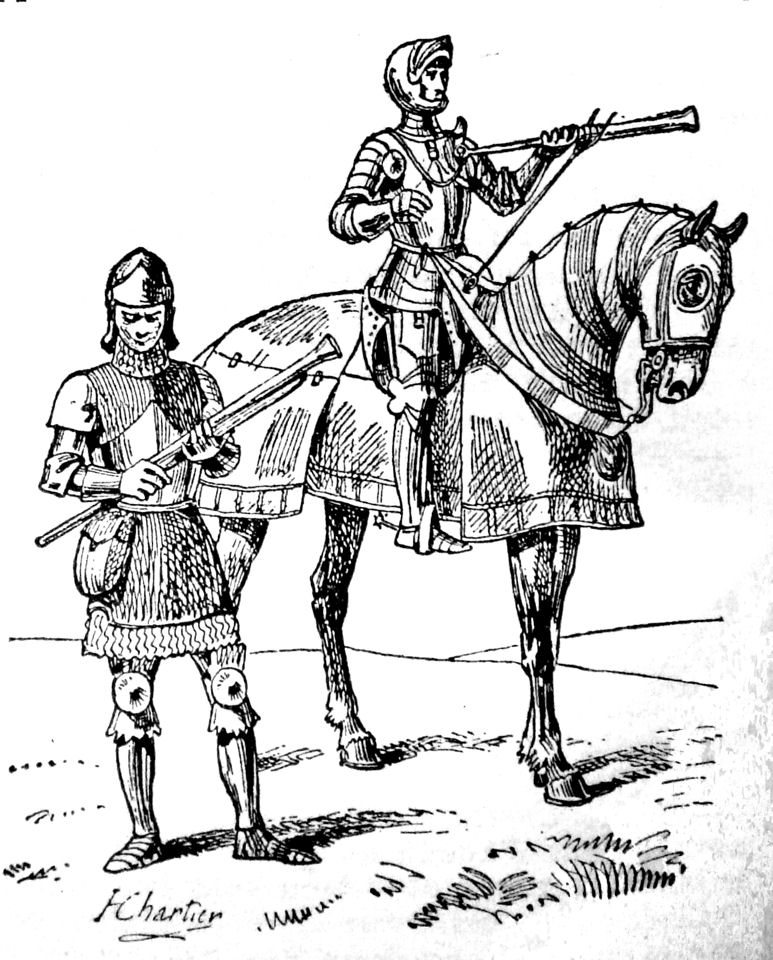
15th century culveriners.

The culverin was also common in 15th century battles, particularly among Burgundian armies. As the smallest of medieval gunpowder weapons, it was relatively light and portable. It fired lead shot, which was inexpensive relative to other available materials.

Significant developments in the 15th century produced very effective bombards, an early form of battering cannon used against walls and towers. These were used both defensively and offensively. Bamburgh Castle, previously thought impregnable, was taken by bombards in 1464. The keep in Wark, Northumberland was described in 1517 as having five storeys "in each of which there were five great murder-holes, shot with great vaults of stone, except one stage which is of timber, so that great bombards can be shot from each of them." An example of a bombard was found in the moat of Bodiam Castle, and a replica is now kept inside.

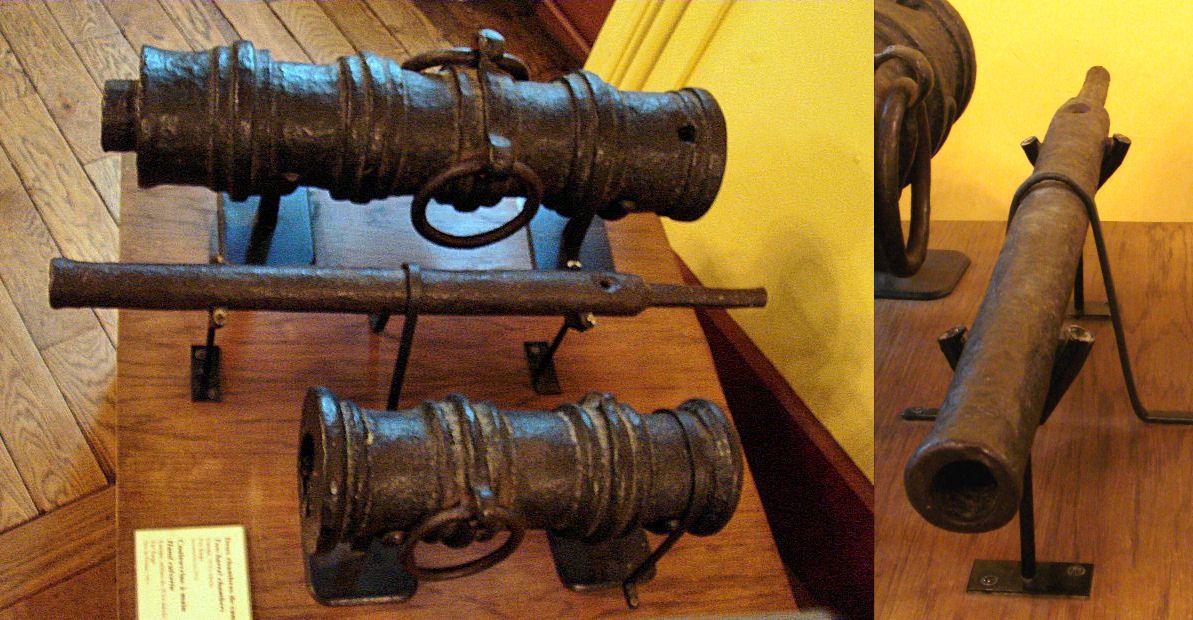
Hand culverin (middle) with two small cannon, Europe, 15th century.

Artillery crews were generally recruited from the city craftsmen. The master gunner was usually the same person as the caster. In larger contingents, the master gunners had responsibility for the heavier artillery pieces, and were accompanied by their journeymen as well as smiths, carpenters, rope makers and carters. Smaller field pieces would be manned by trained volunteers. At the Battle of Flodden, each cannon had its crew of gunners, matrosses and drivers, and a group of pioneers to prepare the path ahead. Even with a level path, the gunpowder mixture used was unstable and could easily separate out into sulphur, saltpetre and charcoal during transport.

Once on site, they would be fired at ground level behind a hinged timber shutter, to provide some protection to the artillery crew. Timber wedges were used to control the barrel's elevation. The majority of medieval cannon were muzzleloaders, and there was as yet no effort to standardise calibres. The usual loading equipment consisted of a copper loading scoop, a ramrod, and a felt brush or "sponge". A bucket of water was always kept beside the cannon. Skins or cloths soaked in cold water could be used to cool down the barrel, while acids could also be added to the water to clean out the inside of the barrel. Hot coals were used to heat the shot or keep the wire primer going.

Some Scottish kings were very interested in the development of cannon, including James II, who was killed by the accidental explosion of one of his own cannon while besieging Roxburgh Castle in 1460. Mons Meg, which dates from about the same time, is perhaps the most famous example of a massive bombard. James IV was Scotland's first Renaissance figure, who also had a fascination with cannon, both at land and at sea. By 1502, he was able to invest in a Scottish navy, which was to have a large number of cannon—his flagship, the Great Michael, was launched in 1511, with 36 great guns, 300 lesser pieces and 120 gunners.

== Use in Eastern Europe ==
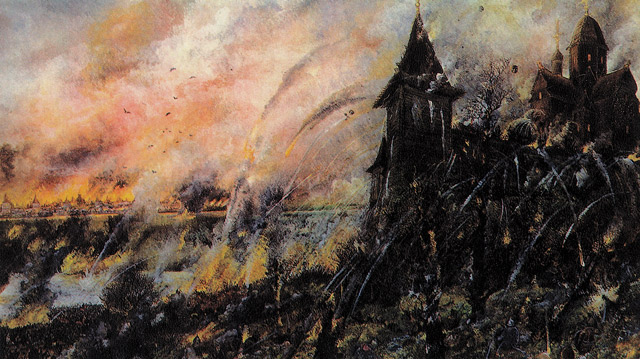
Tokhtamysh's invasion of Russia in 1382, painting by Vasily Sergeyevich Smirnov. At this time, cannon and throwing-machines co-existed.

=== Russia ===
The first cannon appeared in Russia in the 1370–1380s, although initially their use was confined to sieges and the defence of fortresses. The first mention of cannon in Russian chronicles is of "tyufyaks", small howitzer-type cannon that fired case-shot, used to defend Moscow against Tokhtamysh Khan in 1382. Cannon co-existed with throwing-machines until the mid-15th century, when they overtook the latter in terms of destructive power. In 1446, a Russian city fell to cannon fire for the first time, although its wall was not destroyed. However, it was not until 1475 that native cannon production began, when Ivan III established the first Russian cannon foundry in Moscow. The first destruction of a stone wall by cannon fire in Russia came in 1481.

=== Byzantine and Ottoman Empires ===
During the 14th century, the Byzantine Empire began to accumulate its own cannon to face the Ottoman threat, starting with medium-sized cannon 3 feet (0.91 m) long and of 10" calibre. Only a few large bombards were under the Empire's control. The first definite use of artillery in the region was against the Ottoman siege of Constantinople in 1396. These loud Byzantine weapons, possibly operated by the Genoese or "Franks" of Galata, forced the Turks to withdraw.

The Ottomans had acquired their own cannon by the siege of 1422, using "falcons", which were short but wide cannon. The two sides were evenly matched technologically, and the Turks had to build barricades "in order to receive… the stones of the bombards." Because the Empire at this time was facing economic problems, Pope Pius II promoted the affordable donation of cannon by European monarchs as a means of aid. Any new cannon after the 1422 siege were gifts from European states, and aside from these, no other advances were made to the Byzantine arsenal.

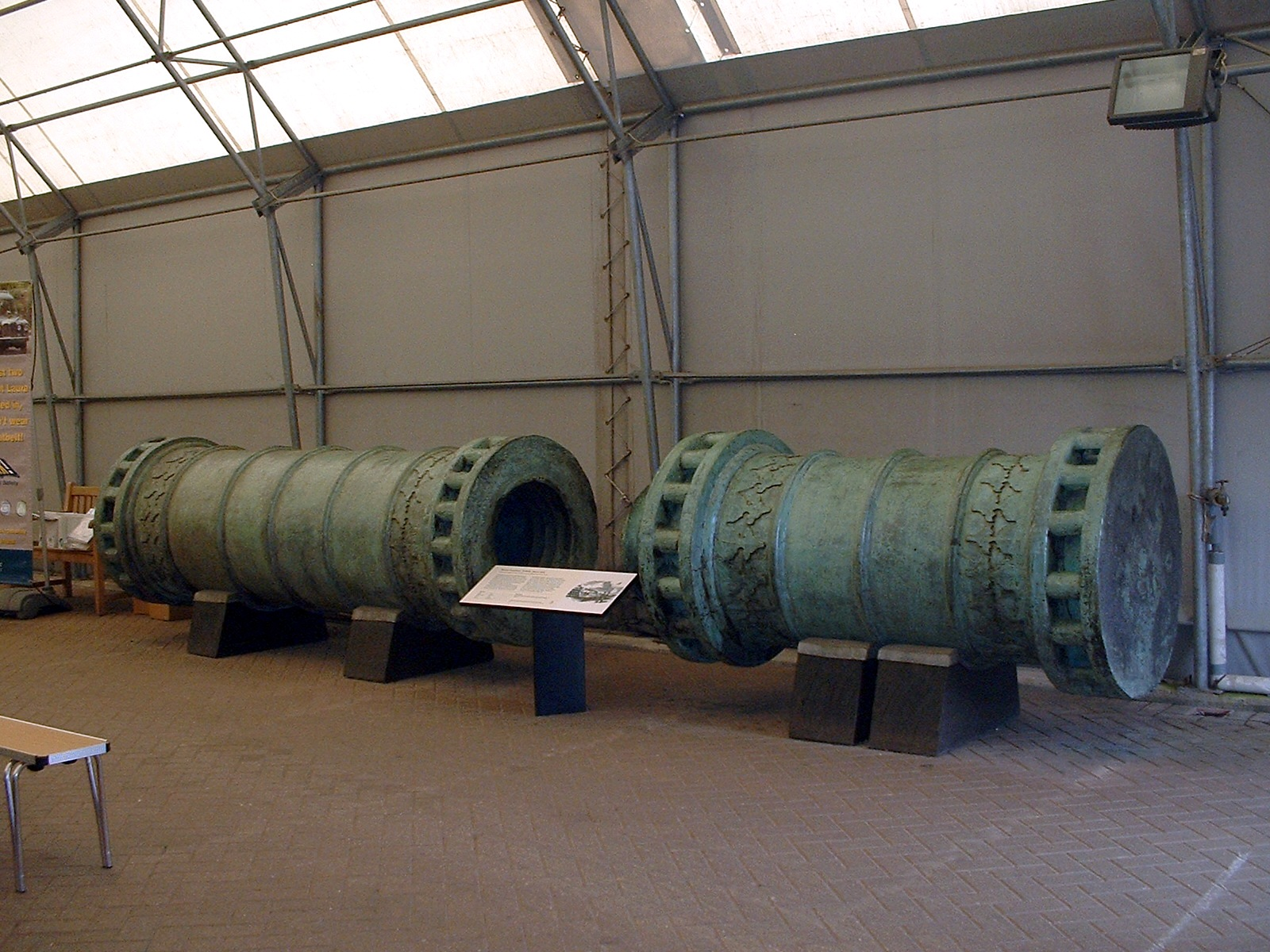
The Dardanelles Gun, a heavy bronze cannon, similar to those at the Siege of Constantinople in 1453

In contrast, when Sultan Mehmet II laid siege to Constantinople in April 1453, he used 68 Hungarian-made cannon, the largest of which was 26 feet (7.9 m) long and weighed 20 tons. This fired a 1,200 pound stone cannonball, and required an operating crew of 200 men. Two such bombards had initially been offered to the Byzantines by the Hungarian artillery expert Urban, which were the pinnacle of gunpowder technology at the time; he boasted that they could reduce "even the walls of Babylon". However, the fact that the Byzantines could not afford it illustrates the financial costs of artillery at the time. These cannon also needed 70 oxen and 10,000 men just to transport them. They were extremely loud, adding to their psychological impact, and Mehmet believed that those who unexpectedly heard it would be struck dumb.

The 55-day bombardment of Constantinople left massive destruction, as recounted by the Greek chronicler Kritovoulos:

And the stone, borne with enormous force and velocity, hit the wall, which it immediately shook and knocked down and was itself broken into many fragments and scattered, hurling the pieces everywhere and killing those who happened to be nearby.

Byzantine counter artillery allowed them to repel any visible Turkish weapons, and the defenders repulsed any attempts to storm any broken points in the walls and hastily repaired any damage. However, the walls could not be adapted for artillery, and towers were not good gun emplacements. There was even worry that the largest Byzantine cannon could cause more damage to their own walls than the Turkish cannon. Gunpowder had also made the formerly devastating Greek fire obsolete, and with the final fall of what had once been the strongest walls in Europe on May 29, "it was the end of an era in more ways than one".

== Cannon at the end of the Middle Ages ==
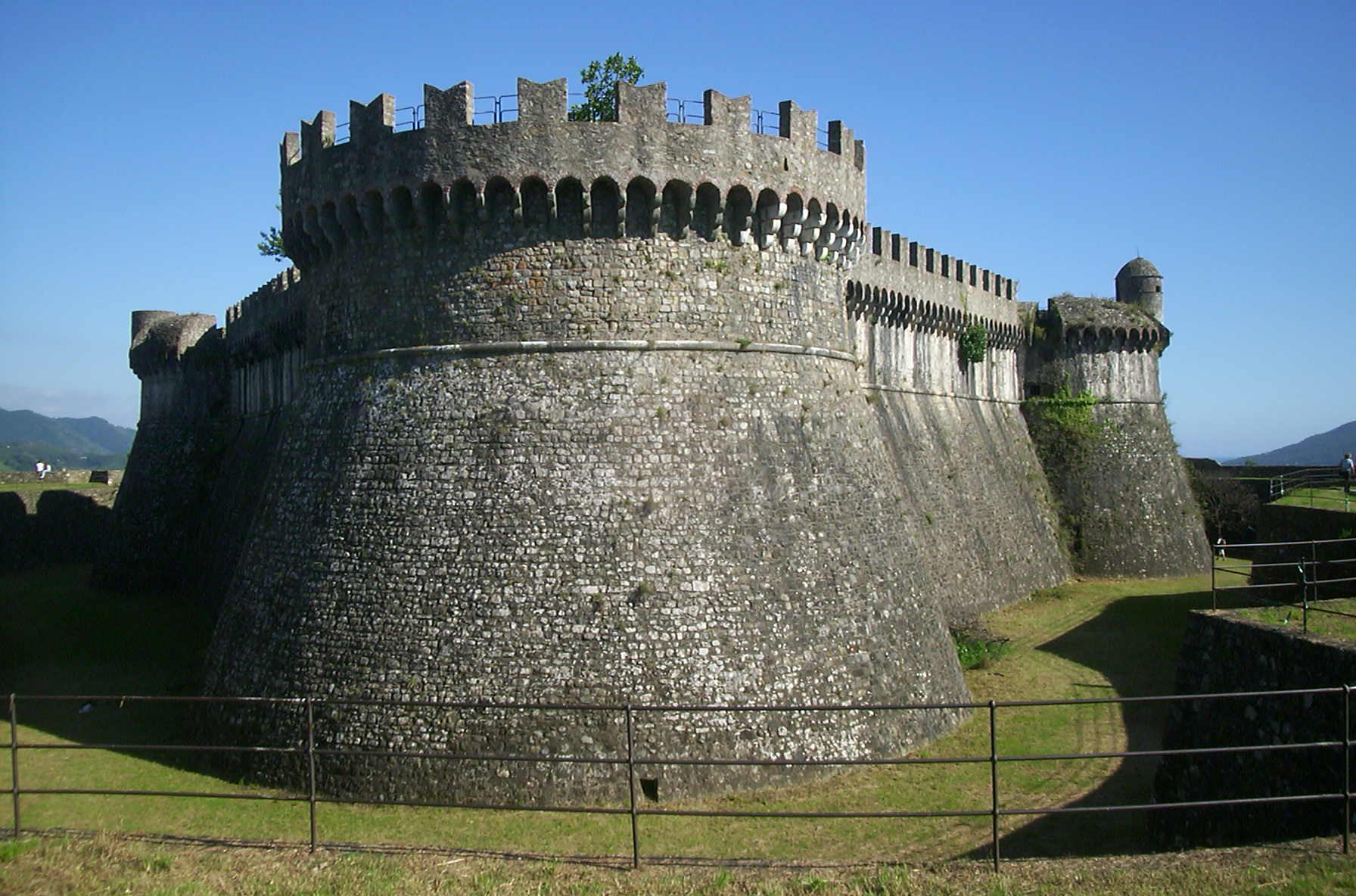
The rounded walls of the 14th century Sarzana Castle showed adaption to gunpowder.

Toward the end of the Middle Ages, the development of cannon made revolutionary changes to siege warfare throughout Europe, with many castles becoming susceptible to artillery fire. The primary aims in castle wall construction were height and thickness, but these became obsolete because they could be damaged by cannonballs. Inevitably, many fortifications previously deemed impregnable proved inadequate in the face of gunpowder. The walls and towers of fortifications had to become lower and wider, and by the 1480s, "Italian tracing" had been developed, which used the corner bastion as the basis of fortifications for centuries to come. The introduction of artillery to siege warfare in the Middle Ages made geometry the main element of European military architecture.

In 16th century England, Henry VIII began building Device Forts between 1539 and 1540 as artillery fortresses to counter the threat of invasion from France and Spain. They were built by the state at strategic points for the first powerful cannon batteries, such as Deal Castle, which was perfectly symmetrical, with a low, circular keep at its centre. Over 200 cannon and gun ports were set within the walls, and the fort was essentially a firing platform, with a shape that allowed many lines of fire; its low curved bastions were designed to deflect cannonballs.

To guard against artillery and gunfire, increasing use was made of earthen, brick and stone breastworks and redoubts, such as the geometric fortresses of the 17th century French Marquis de Vauban. Although the obsolescence of castles as fortifications was hastened by the developments of cannon from the 14th century on, many medieval castles still managed to "put up a prolonged resistance" against artillery during the English Civil War of 17th century.

== See also ==
- Early thermal weapons

== General references ==
- Bag, A. K. (2005). "Fathullah Shirazi: Cannon, Multi-barrel Gun and Yarghu". Indian Journal of History of Science.
- Bennet, Matthew; Connolly, Peter (1998). The Hutchinson Dictionary of Ancient & Medieval Warfare. contributors John Gillingham and John Lazenby. Taylor & Francis. ISBN 1-57958-116-1.
- Bottomley, Frank (1983). The Castle Explorer's Guide. Crown Publishers. ISBN 0-517-42172-0.
- Bradbury, Jim (1992). The Medieval Siege. Rochester, New York: Boydell & Brewer. p. 390. ISBN 0-85115-312-7.
- Braun, Wernher Von; Frederick Ira Ordway (1967). History of Rocketry & Space Travel. Thomas Y. Crowell Co. ISBN 0-690-00588-1.
- Brodie, Fawn McKay; Brodie, Bernard (1973). From Crossbow to H-Bomb. Bloomington: Indiana University Press. ISBN 0-253-20161-6.
- Carman, W. Y. (2004). A History of Firearms: From Earliest Times to 1914. New York: Dover Publications. ISBN 0-486-43390-0.
- Chartrand, René (2005-03-20). French Fortresses in North America 1535–1763: Quebec, Montreal, Louisbourg and New Orleans. Osprey Publishing. ISBN 978-1-84176-714-7.
- Encyclopædia Britannica. London. 1771.
- Gat, Azar (2006). War in Human Civilization. New York City: Oxford University Press. p. 839. ISBN 0-19-926213-6.
- Hoffmeyer, Ada Bruhn de (1972). Arms and Armour in Spain. Madrid: Instituto do Estudios sobre Armas Antiguas, Consejo Superior de Investigaciones Científicas, Patronato Menendez y Pelayo.
- Gernet, Jacques (1996). A History of Chinese Civilisation. Cambridge University Press. ISBN 0-521-49781-7.
- Manucy, Albert (1994-04-01). Artillery Through the Ages: A Short Illustrated History of Cannon, Emphasizing Types Used in America. Diane publishing. p. 97. ISBN 0-7881-0745-3.
- Mariana, Juan de. Historia general de Espana, 2 volumes, Madrid, 1608, ii, 27; English translation by Captain John Stephens, The General History of Spain, 2 parts, London, 1699, p 2 64
- Miller, Douglas; Embleton, Gerry (1979). The Swiss at War 1300-1500. Illustrated by Gerry Embleton. Osprey Publishing. p. 52. ISBN 0-85045-334-8.
- Needham, Joseph (1986). Science and Civilization in China: Volume 5, Part 7. Taipei: Caves Books, Ltd.
- Nicolle, David (2000). Crécy 1346: Triumph of the Longbow. Osprey Publishing. p. 102. ISBN 978-1-85532-966-9.
- Nossov, Konstantin; Ancient and Medieval Siege Weapons, UK: Spellmount Ltd, 2006. ISBN 1-86227-343-X
- Nossov, Konstantin (2007). Medieval Russian Fortresses AD 862–1480. Osprey Publishing. ISBN 978-1-84603-093-2.
- Partington, J. R., A History of Greek Fire and Gunpowder, reprint by Johns Hopkins University Press, p. 191 (Latin text of Zurita)
- Sadler, John; Walsh, Stephen (2006-05-30). Flodden 1513: Scotland's Greatest Defeat. Osprey Publishing. p. 100. ISBN 978-1-84176-959-2.
- Turnbull, Stephen; Dennis, Peter (2004-10-22). The Walls of Constantinople AD 413–1453. Osprey Publishing. p. 70. ISBN 1-84176-759-X.
- Watson, R. Chemical Essays, vol. I, London, 1787, 1999.
- Wilkinson, Philip (1997-09-09). Pockets: Castles. Dorling Kindersley. ISBN 978-0-7894-2047-3.
