= Pasarón =

Pasarón may refer to:

- Pasarón de la Vera, a municipality in Spain
- Patricio Montojo y Pasarón (1839-1917), a Spanish admiral
- Estadio Municipal de Pasarón, a football stadium in Pontevedra, Spain
