= Gila Giraldo =

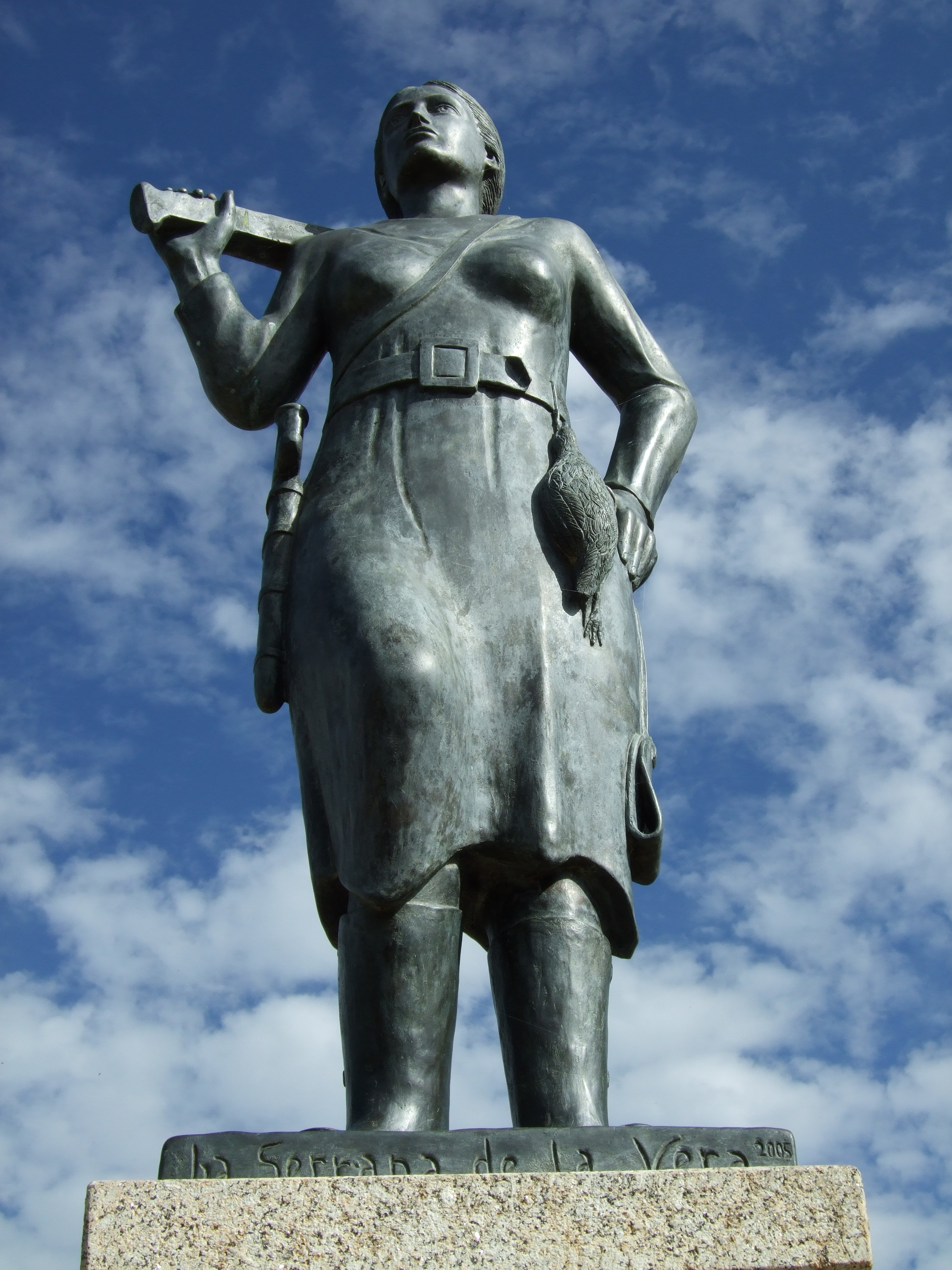
Statue of La serrana de la vera overlooking Garganta la Olla

Gila Giraldo, known as "La Serrana de la Vera" (The Mountain Girl of la Vera) was a probably-legendary Spanish figure who inspired numerous legends, romances and theatrical pieces during the 18th century Spanish Golden Age. Said to be both beautiful and extraordinarily strong, after being betrayed by her lover she fled to a cave in the mountainside, where she would seduce and murder men.

Most famously, she is the protagonist of Luis Vélez de Guevara's La serrana de la vera 1613 play.
