= Arroyomolinos =

Arroyomolinos may refer to:

- Arroyomolinos, Madrid, a municipality in the autonomous community of Madrid, Spain
- Arroyomolinos, Cáceres, a municipality in the province of Cáceres, Extremadura, Spain
- Arroyomolinos de la Vera, a municipality in the province of Cáceres, Extremadura, Spain
- Arroyomolinos de León, a municipality in the province of Huelva, Andalusia, Spain
