= Jaraíz de la Vera =

- Municipality
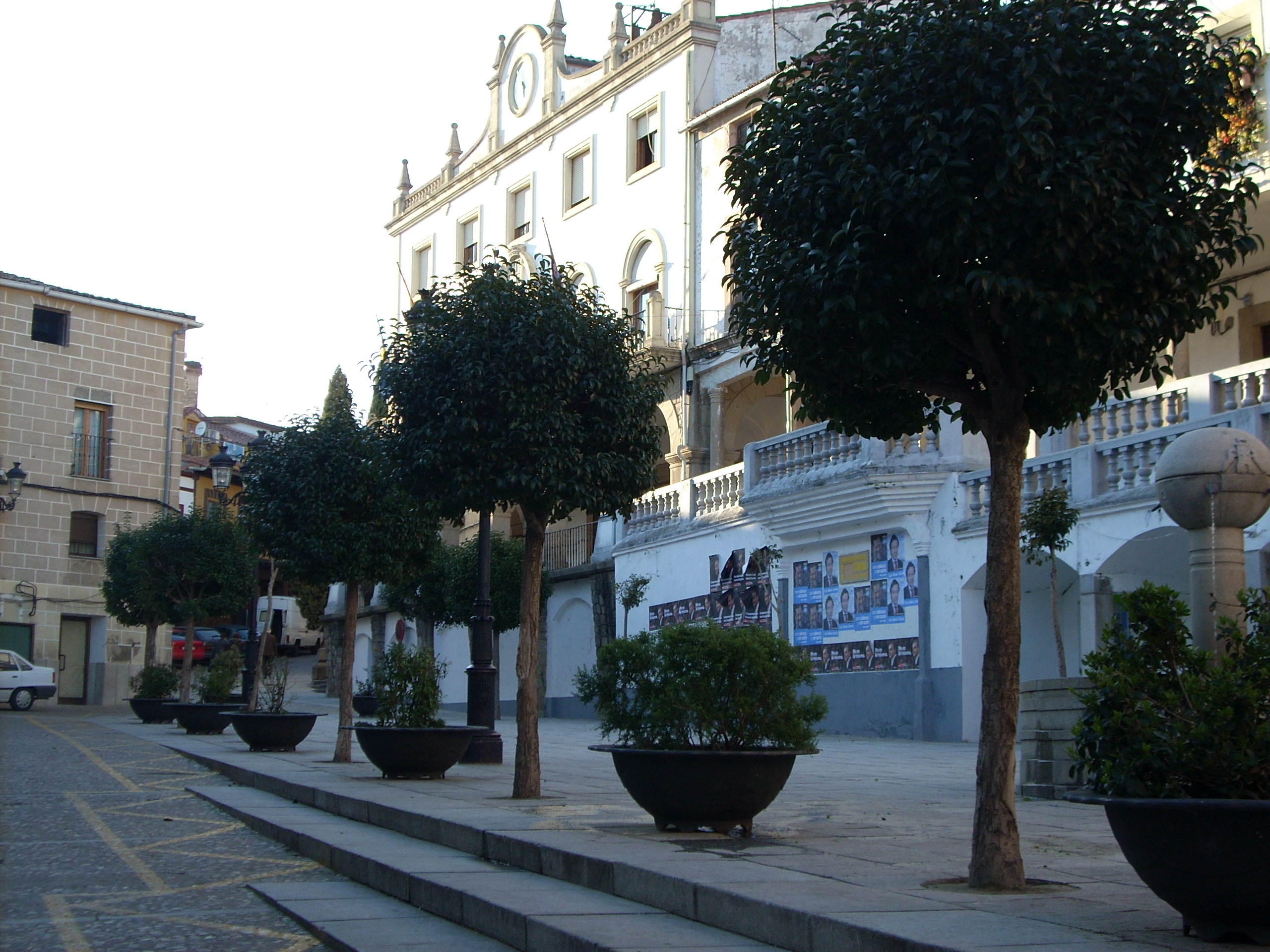
- Plaza Mayor

- Flag Coat of arms

- Location of Jaraíz de la Vera in Extremadura Location of Jaraíz de la Vera in Spain.
- Coordinates: 40°03′37″N 5°45′18″W
- Country: Spain
- Autonomous community: Extremadura
- Province: Cáceres
- Comarca: La Vera

Area
  - Total: 62.52 km^{2} (24.14 sq mi)
- Elevation: 561 m (1,841 ft)

Population (2025-01-01)
  - Total: 6,831
  - Density: 109.3/km^{2} (283.0/sq mi)
- Time zone: UTC+1 (CET)
  - Summer (DST): UTC+2 (CEST)
- Website: jaraizdelavera.es

Jaraíz de la Vera (Spanish: [xaɾaˈis ðe la ˈβeɾa]) is a municipality located in the province of Cáceres, Extremadura, Spain. According to the 2012 census (INE), the municipality has a population of 6,727 inhabitants. It is situated to the north of Extremadura and it is the capital city of the comarca La Vera.

From 1964 to 1991 the town was home to "The Institute of Studies on Ancient Weapons" which was part of the Higher Council for Scientific Research. The institute was led by Ada Bruhn Hoffmeyer and her husband.

== See also ==
- List of municipalities in Cáceres
