= Roskilde Cathedral School =

Location
- Roskilde, Denmark; 55.6341°N 12.0582°E

Information
- Type: public gymnasium
- Founded: c. 1020; 1006 years ago
- Principal: Claus Niller Nielsen
- Faculty: 150
- Enrollment: 1,500
- Website: www.roskildekatedralskole.dk

Roskilde Cathedral School (Danish: Roskilde Katedralskole, Roskilde Domskole) is a historic high school in Roskilde, Denmark. It was established around 1020 with close connections to Roskilde Cathedral. The school has since 1969 been located on Holbækvej in the western part of the city while its old main building next to the cathedral now houses Roskilde Gymnasium, another high school.

== History ==
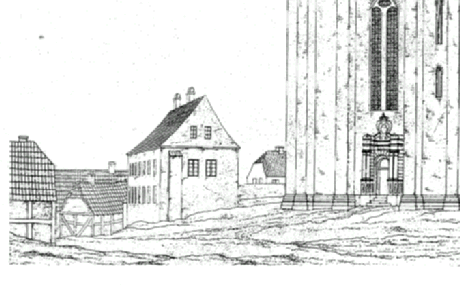
Old drawing of Roskilde Domskole

The school was probably established in the early 11th century (c. 1020) in connection with the cathedral. It was initially designed for the education of priests who could serve the cathedral. There are references to pupils at the school from 1074. Around 1080, a building was constructed to the north of the first travertine cathedral known as Kloster for Brødrene (Friars' Cloister) which was no doubt used as a school house. When the brick cathedral was built in the 13th century, a new school building was constructed immediately west of the cathedral.

After the Reformation in 1536, the school was struck by a period of poverty, forcing the pupils to beg in the neighbourhood for food and clothing. The curriculum did not change until the 18th century when it was adapted to include both theology and law, attracting more pupils.

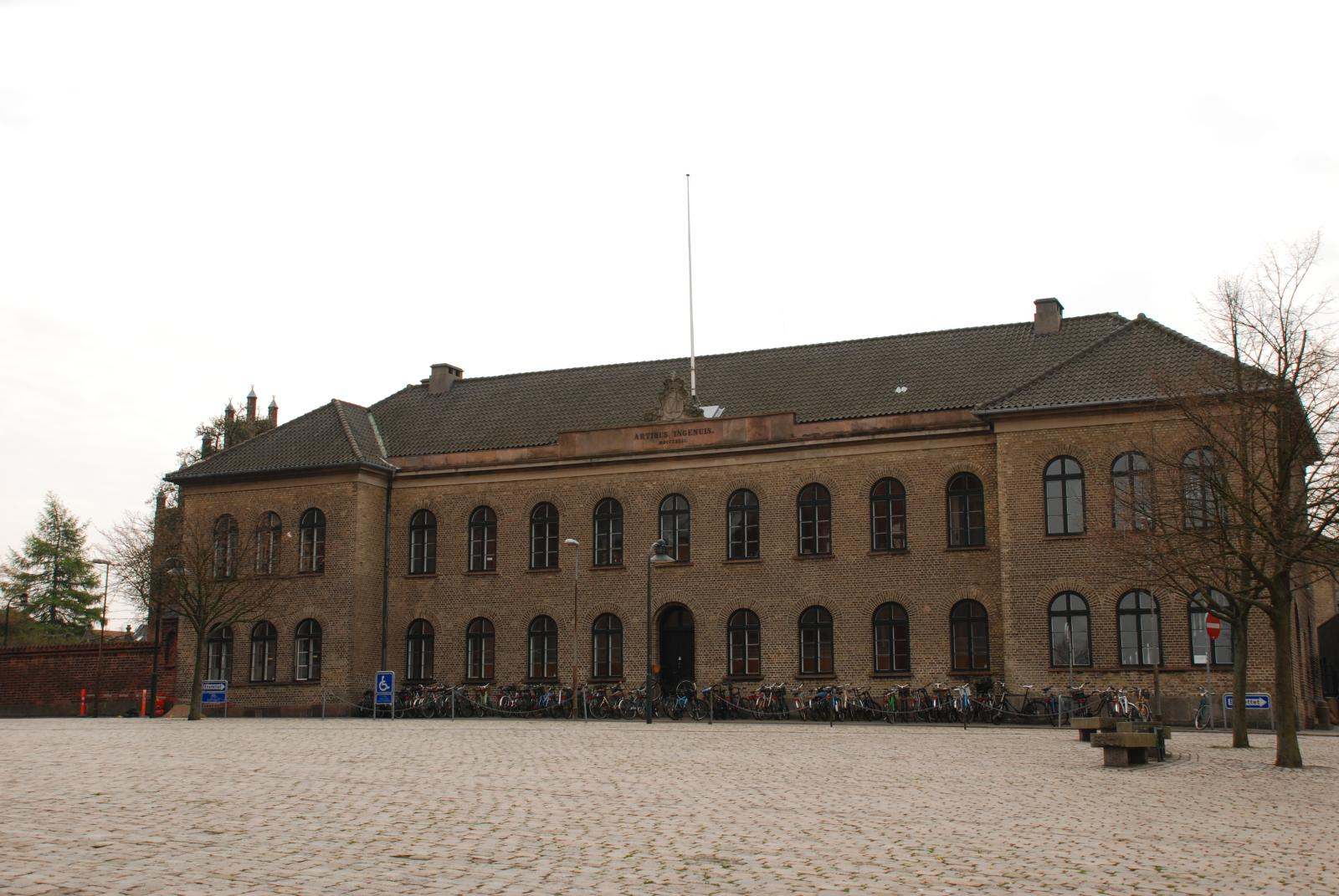
The building from 1842, now home to Roskilde Gymnasium

A new building for the school was completed on the cathedral square in 1842 to a design by Jørgen Hansen Koch. With its six classrooms, it was able to accommodate all 70 pupils. Girls were first admitted to the school in 1903 but were initially kept away from the boys. Despite several extensions, by 1969 the building had again become too small. The school moved to its current premises on Holbækvej designed by Preben Hansen.

== Today ==
As of September 2014, the school has 1,352 pupils and a staff of 150, of whom 129 are teachers.

== Notable alumni ==
- Absalon (ca. 1128-1201), archbishop, statesman
- Saxo Grammaticus (ca. 1150-1208), historian
- Christian Friis til Borreby (1556–1616), Chancellor of Denmark
- Andreas Brünniche (1704–1769), painter
- Andreas Christian Hviid (1749–1788), linguist and theologian
- Gottsche Hans Olsen (1760–1829), writer, diplomat and theatre director
- Johan Ernst Hartmann (1770–1844), composer
- Severin Claudius Wilken Bindesbøll (1798–1871), bishop and politician
- Jacob Kornerup (1825–1913), archaeologist and painter
- Carl von Nutzhorn (1828–1899), politician and minister of justice
- Ludvig Holstein-Ledreborg (1839–1912), prime minister
- Vilhelm Topsøe (1840–1881), writer and journalist
- Morten Pedersen Porsild (1872–1956), botanist
- Vilhelm Lassen (1861–1908), politician and finance minister
- Asger Ostenfeld (1866–1931), engineer
- Eduard Reventlow (1883–1963), diplomat
- Poul Sørensen (1904–1969), politician
- Aksel Schiøtz (1906–1975), singer
- Ada Bruhn Hoffmeyer (1910-1991) weapons expert
- Elias Bredsdorff (1912–2002), writer and resistance fighter
- Lise Nørgaard (born 1917), writer
- Jytte Hilden (born 1942), politician
- Ib Michael (born 1945), novelist, poet
- Thure Lindhardt (born 1974), actor

== Literature ==
- Bruhn Hoffmeyer, Adelheid Maria (1965). Artibus ingenuis: Roskilde katedralskole gennem tiderne (in Danish). Roskildenser-Samfundet.
