= Tejeda de Tiétar =

- Municipality
- Coat of arms

- Location in Spain.
- Coordinates: 40°01′N 5°52′W
- Country: Spain
- Autonomous community: Extremadura
- Province: Cáceres
- Comarca: La Vera

Government
  - Mayor: Dolores Paniagua Timón

Area
  - Total: 52.83 km^{2} (20.40 sq mi)
- Elevation: 446 m (1,463 ft)

Population (2025-01-01)
  - Total: 761
  - Density: 14.4/km^{2} (37.3/sq mi)
- Demonym: Tejedanos
- Time zone: UTC+1 (CET)
  - Summer (DST): UTC+2 (CEST)

Tejeda de Tiétar is a municipality located in the province of Cáceres, Extremadura, western Spain. As of 2010, the population is 883.

== See also ==
- List of municipalities in Cáceres
