= Guijo de Santa Bárbara =

- municipality
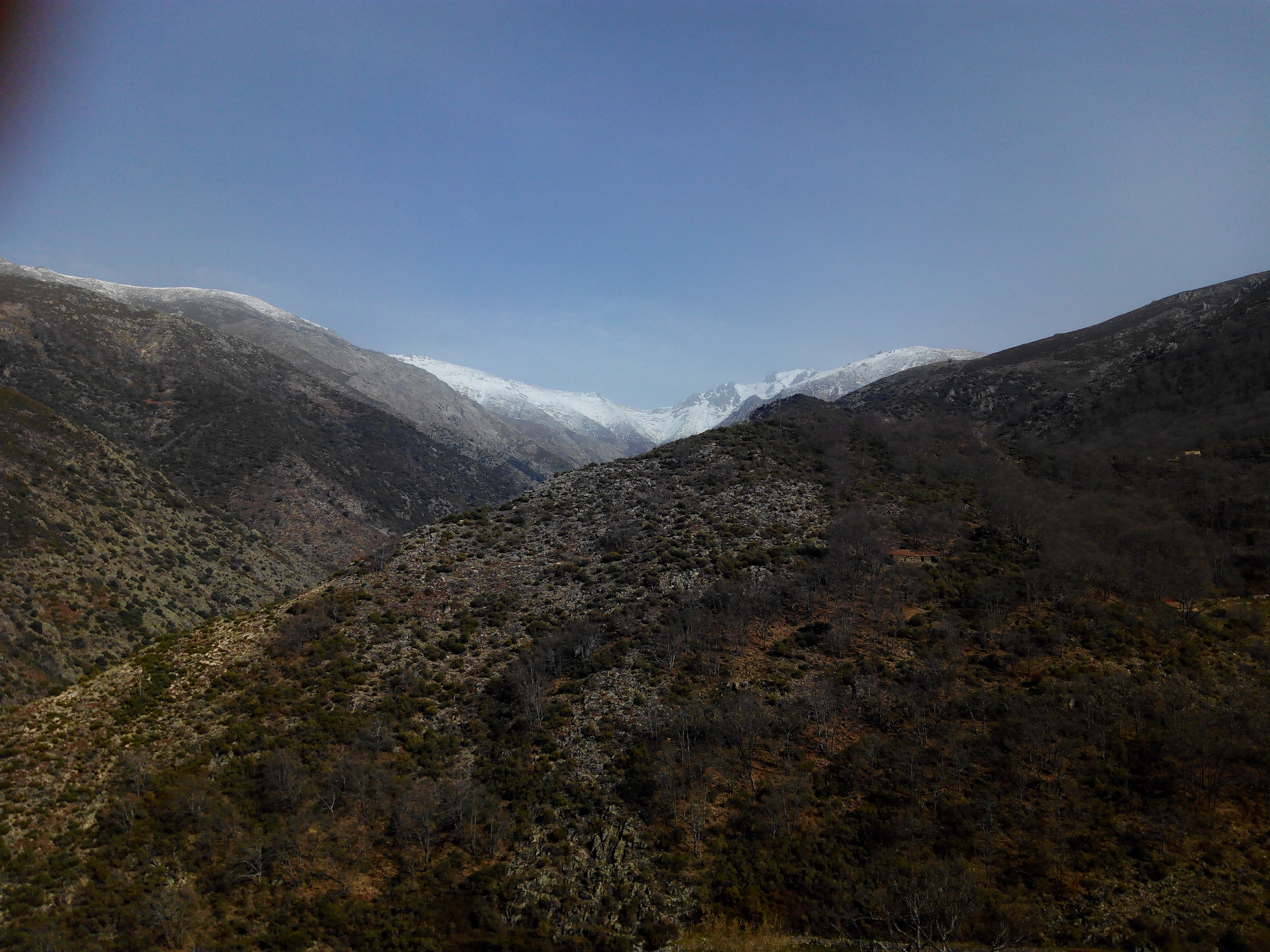
- Mountains of Guijo de Santa Bárbara

- Flag Coat of arms

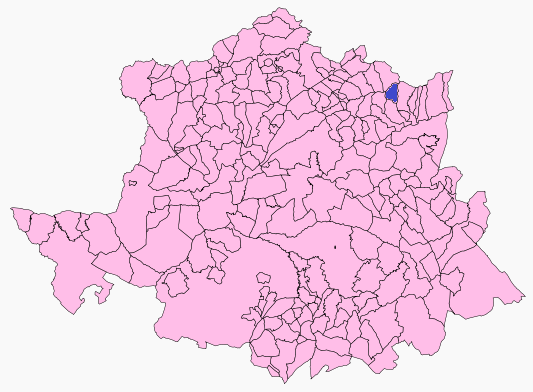
- Map of Guijo de Santa Bárbara
- Coordinates: 40°09′N 5°39′W
- Country: Spain
- Autonomous community: Extremadura
- Province: Cáceres
- Comarca: La Vera

Area
  - Total: 35 km^{2} (14 sq mi)
- Elevation: 876 m (2,874 ft)

Population (2025-01-01)
  - Total: 386
  - Density: 11/km^{2} (29/sq mi)
- Time zone: UTC+1 (CET)
  - Summer (DST): UTC+2 (CEST)

Guijo de Santa Bárbara is a municipality located in the province of Cáceres, Extremadura, Spain. According to the 2005 census (INE), the municipality has a population of 429 inhabitants.

== Overview ==
This village is located at Gredos Mountains and a river known as Garganta de Jaranda. Most of the land of the municipality is placed inside a natural space (LIC de la Sierra de Gredos).

The village is a typical destination for holidays, due to be near to Madrid (2 hours by car), and because of the opportunities for walking in the mountain and the river.

The population mainly works in touristic services (hostels, bars, etc.) and agriculture.

Main festivities are celebrated in August (14-15), September (8 and 9), and December (2-4). Other events are Viriato Day in May and Trashumancia's Day in June–July.

== See also ==
- List of municipalities in Cáceres
