= Aldeanueva de la Vera =

Aldeanueva de la Verar
- municipality
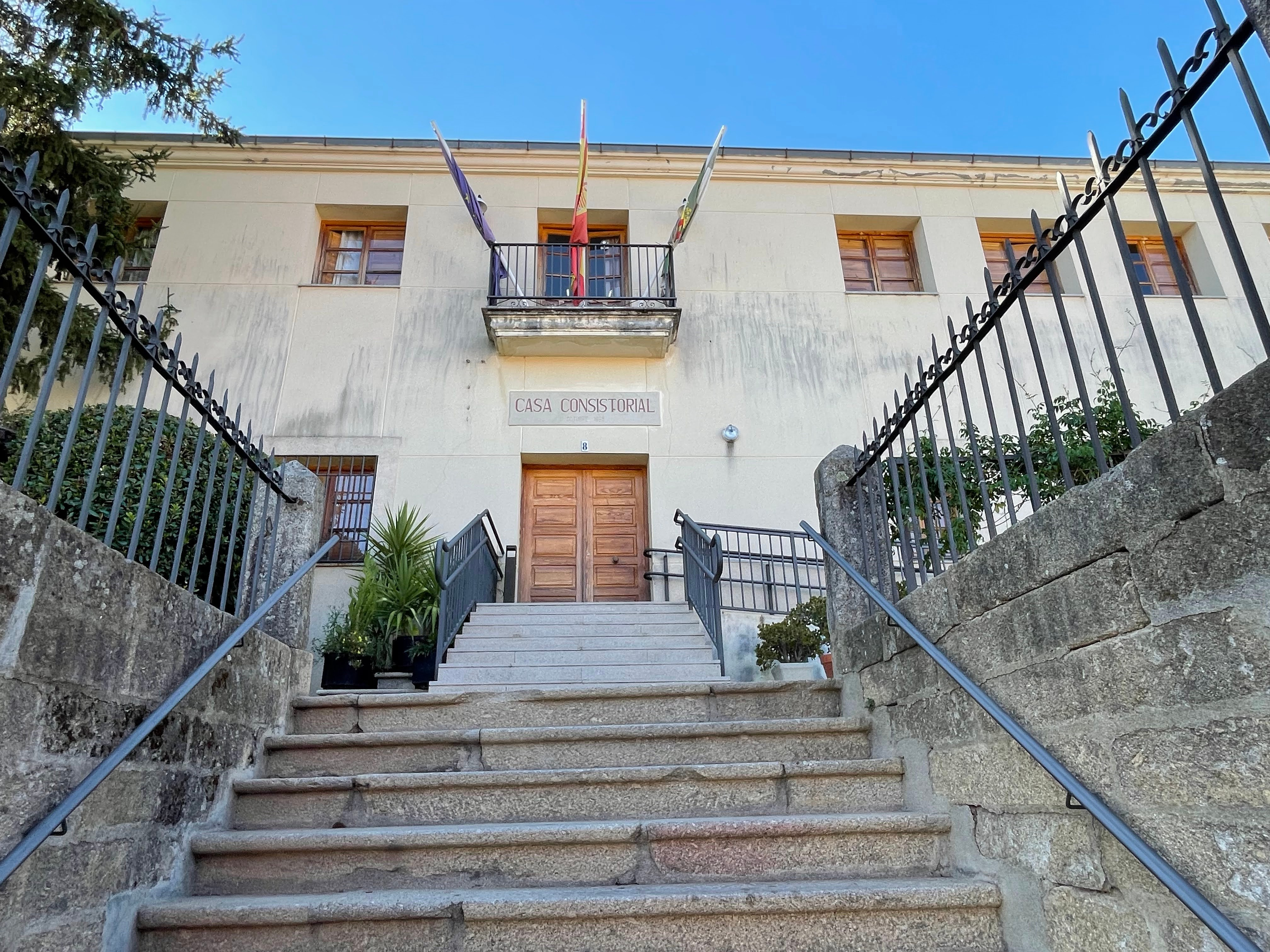
- Town hall

- Coat of arms

- Location in Spain.
- Coordinates: 40°01′N 5°52′W
- Country: Spain
- Autonomous community: Extremadura
- Province: Cáceres
- Comarca: La Vera

Government
  - Mayor: Raúl Amor Veliz

Area
  - Total: 37.6 km^{2} (14.5 sq mi)
- Elevation: 658 m (2,159 ft)

Population (2025-01-01)
  - Total: 1,966
  - Density: 52.3/km^{2} (135/sq mi)
- Demonym: Aldeanovenses
- Time zone: UTC+1 (CET)
  - Summer (DST): UTC+2 (CEST)
- Website: Official website

Aldeanueva de la Vera is a municipality located in the province of Cáceres, Extremadura, western Spain.

Aldeanueva the la Vera is situated in the Sierra de Gredos. It has a predominantly agricultural economy, producing tobacco, figs, cherries, red pepper powder (pimenton la casareña) and the regional wine "pitarra".

== See also ==
- List of municipalities in Cáceres
