= Walter de Milemete =

English writer

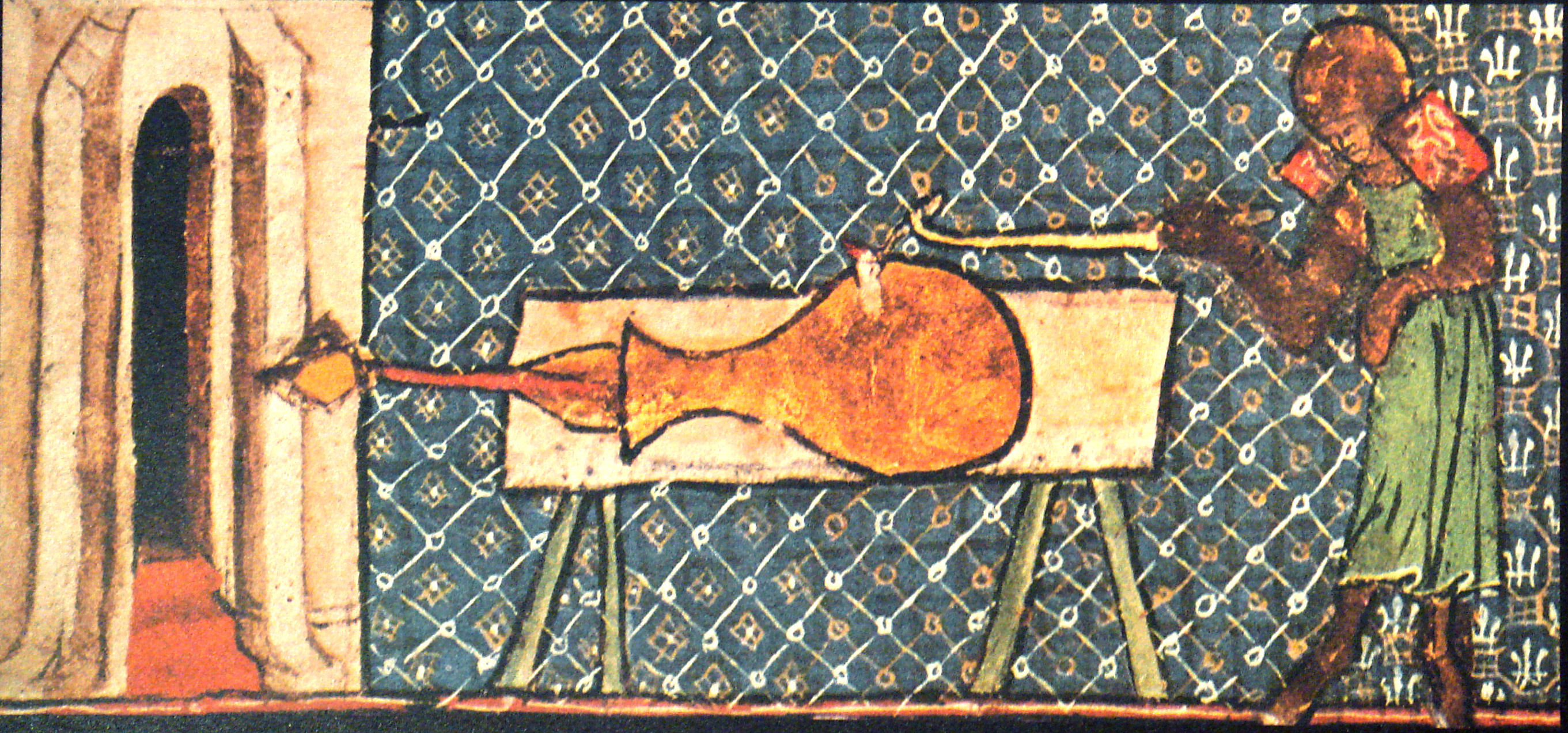
Earliest picture of a European cannon, De nobilitatibus, sapientiis et prudentiis regum, Walter de Milemete, 1326

Walter de Milemete was an English scholar who in his early twenties was commissioned by Queen Isabella of France to write a treatise on kingship for her son, the young prince Edward, later king Edward III of England called De nobilitatibus, sapientiis, et prudentiis regum in 1326. The Treatise includes images of siege weapons and what is probably the first illustration of a firearm: a pot-de-fer. One of the marginal border illustrations in the Milemete Treatise shows a soldier firing a large vase-shaped cannon, the arrow-shaped projectile is seen projecting from the cannon which is pointed at a fortification. In the 1331 siege of Cividale, German knights used guns which were probably very similar to Milemete weapons.

The treatise includes an illustration of St. George giving Prince Edward a shield decorated with coat of arms. The manuscript, in a red velvet binding, is now held by the library of Christ Church, Oxford. The treatise also depicts a group of knights flying a firebomb kite laden black-powder filled firebomb over the wall of city.

== See also ==
- History of firearms
- History of artillery
- History of gunpowder
