= Ada Bruhn Hoffmeyer =

Danish weapons expert

- Born: 1 December 1910; Roskilde
- Died: 8 August 1991 (aged 80)
- Known for: expert on arms and armour

Ada Bruhn Hoffmeyer (1 December 1910 – 8 August 1991) was a Danish museum curator, writer and medieval weapons expert. She founded "The Institute of Studies on Ancient Weapons" which was recognised as the authority on Spanish arms and armour.

== Life ==
Hoffmeyer was born in Roskilde. a large city on an island near Copenhagen, in 1910. Her father Lauritz J. Bruhn was in the police and Alfa Karen Margrethe Larsen was her mother. She left Roskilde Cathedral School in 1923 and she had always been interested in archaeology. Hohhmeyer began her studies at the University of Copenhagen in 1929. In 1936 she completed her thesis on "Oltos and early red-figure vase painting" in 1936.

She worked in several museums and joined the Tøjhusmuseet in 1939. She obtained funding to study in Rome where she published "Oltos and Early Greek Vase Painting" in 1943. By this time she was leading the Tøjhusmuseet's department of weapons and armour.

In 1945 she became a doctor with a dissertation on the Medieval double-edged sword. This was published in 1954 and was well regarded as a source for study.

In 1960 she left her work citing differences and together with her husband they created "The Institute of Studies on Ancient Weapons" in Kalundborg. The institute published a magazine called Gladius and she was the editor. Her husband looked after the photos and the library. They wanted to live in a better climate so they settled in Spain as her husband was a Hispanist. They and the institute were based in the town of Jaraíz de la Vera and in 1964 they succeeded in gaining recognition when the institute became part of the Higher Council for Scientific Research. There she wrote two volumes on Arms and Armour. Her husband died in 1973 and after that she continued alone.

== Publications ==
- Oltos and Early Greek Vase Painting, 1943
- Medieval double-edged sword, 1954
- Roskilde Cathedral School through the ages, 1965 (contributor)
- Military Equipment in the Manuscript of Scylitzes in Biblioteca Nacional, 1966
- Arms and Armour in Spain vol. 1, 1972
- From Medieval Sword to Renaissance Rapier. 1980
- Arms and Armour in Spain vol. 2, 1981
