= Pot-de-fer =

Early tube-shaped cannon

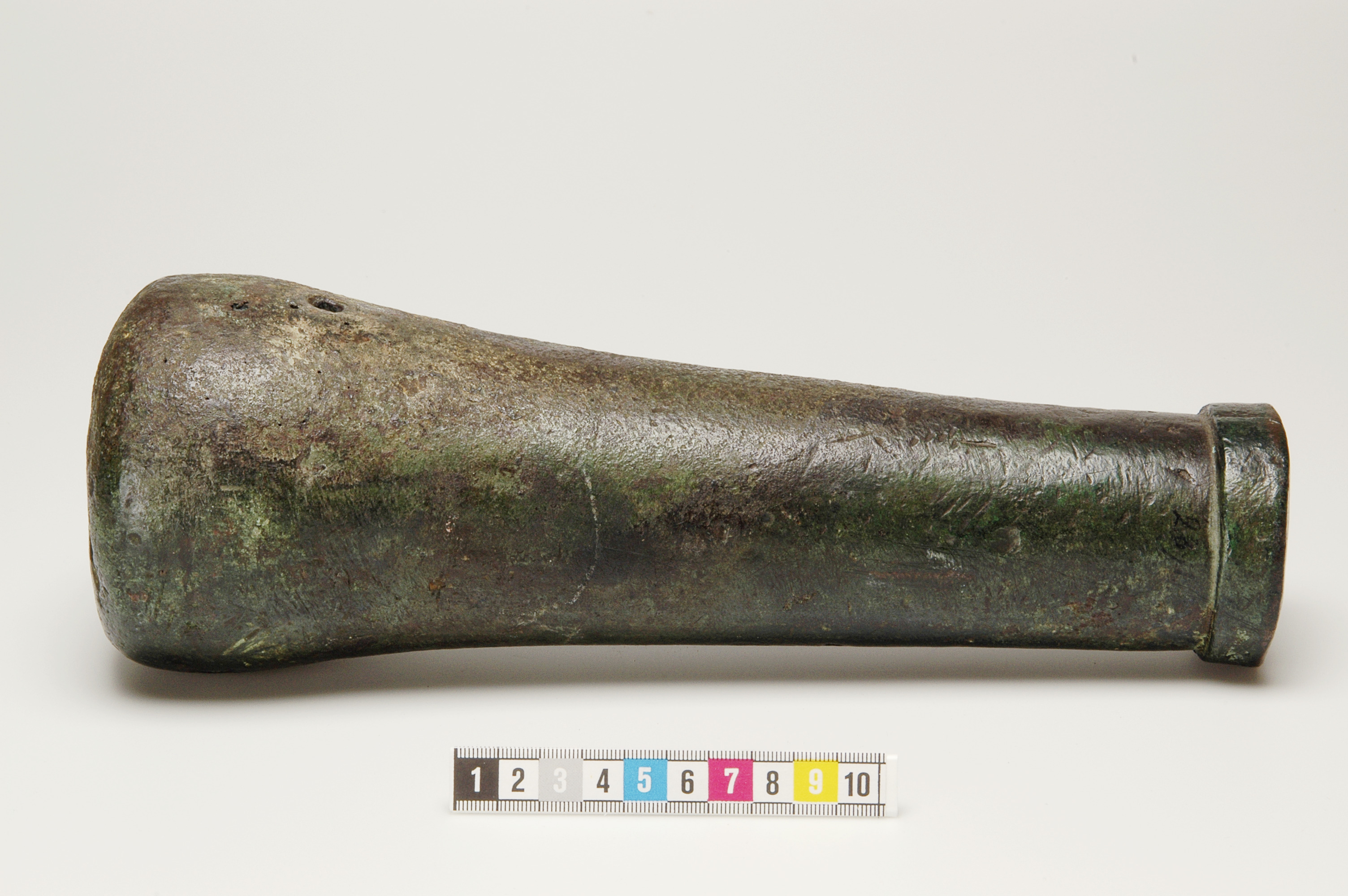
Vase gun found in Loshult, Sweden (1st half of the 14th century?)

The pot-de-fer (French: "iron pot"), also called vasi (Italian: "pot") or simply vase gun, was an early type of cannon. Appearing in Europe from the 1320s, it derives its name from its small, vase-like shape. Mainly used to fire large bolts (garros), it replaced the springald. Over the course of the 14th century vase-shaped cannons were eventually replaced by tube-shaped cannons, which from the late 14th cannons became increasingly larger and eventually developed into bombards.

== Description ==
Though occasionally made with cast bronze, the pot-de-fer was essentially an iron bottle with a narrow neck. It was loaded with powder and an iron arrow-like bolt, feathered with iron. It is believed that the middle of the bolt was likely wrapped in leather for a snug fit, necessary to enhance the thrust from the gaseous pressure within the cannon. However, this feature is not shown in manuscript illuminations. The cannon was set off through a small-diameter touchhole, where a red-hot wire could be thrust to set off an explosion and fire the cannon.

== History ==
=== Chinese origins ===
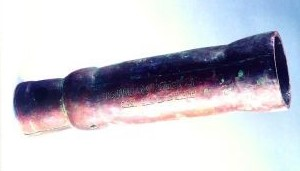
The Xanadu Gun from 1298, which is the earliest dated cannon.

Guns emerged in China in the 13th century, developing from fire lances (tubes made of wood or paper that spew ignited gunpowder). An early gun is the bronze Wuwei cannon, which is associated with the fall of the Western Xia in 1227, but may also be slightly younger. While relatively primitive und unevenly cast it weighs well over 100 kilogram. The development of the gun was an accomplished fact by about 1280, during the early years of the Yuan dynasty (1271–1368). The oldest dated cannon is the Xanadu Gun from 1298, weighing about 6 kilogram and thirty-five centimeters long. Except of its manufacture year it also features a serial number and other manufacturing information, suggesting that by the end of the 13th century Chinese gun manufacturing had been codified and systematized. Small guns like these, which rarely exceeded a few kilogram, remained in use in China well into 16th century, mainly as antipersonell weapons.

=== In Europe ===
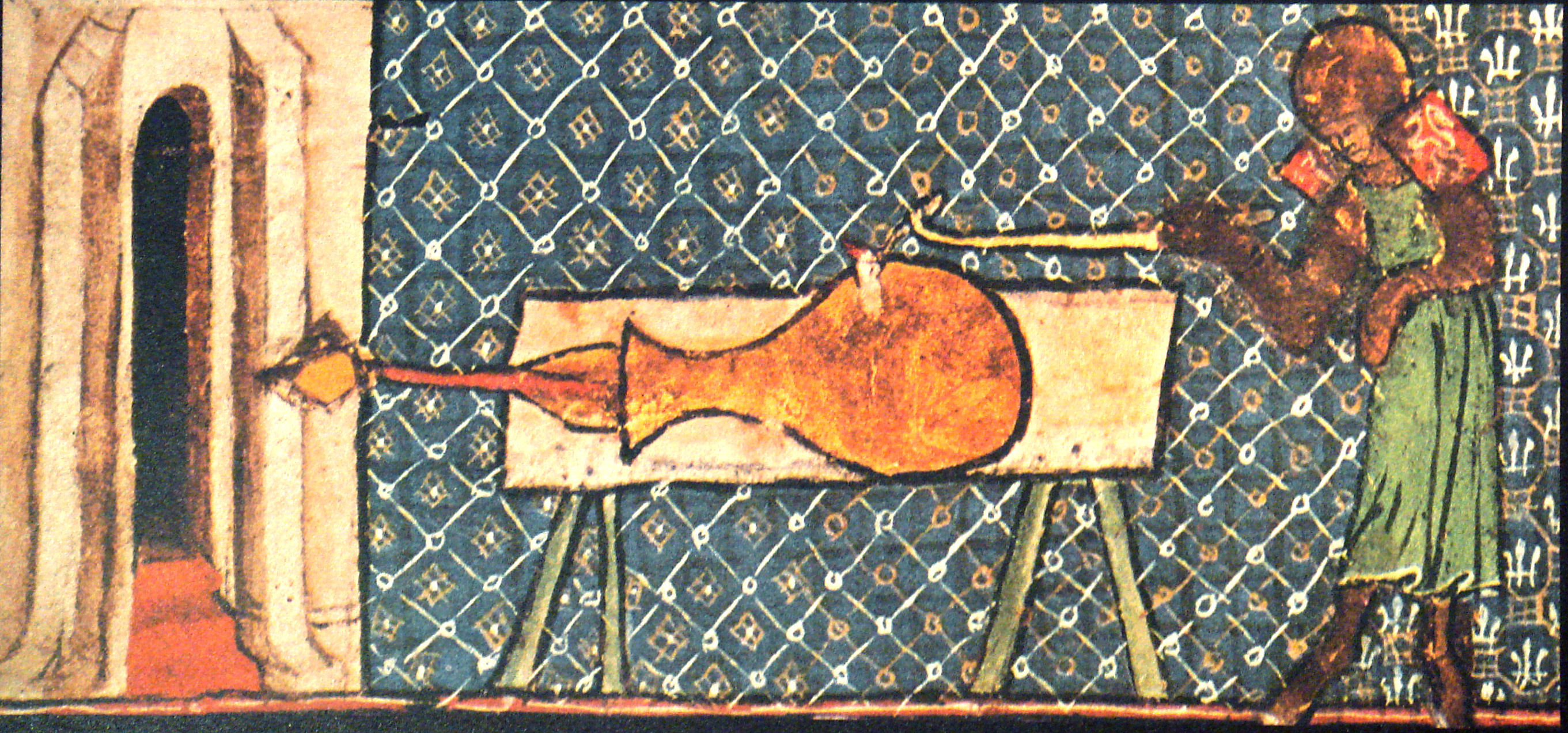
A soldier firing a large bolt from a trestle-mounted vase gun. From Walter de Milemete's De Nobilitatibus, 1326–7.

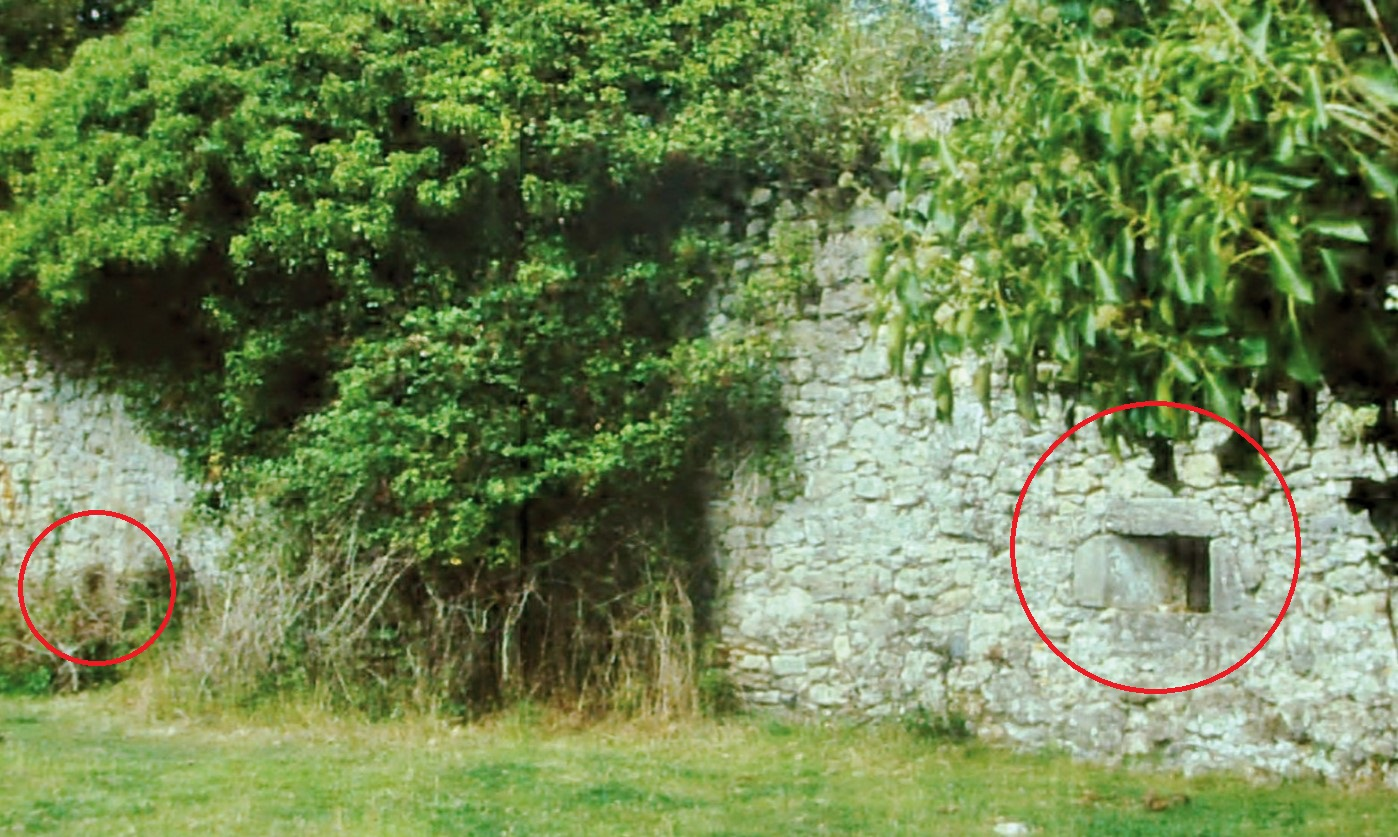
Two gun ports (circled) cut into the seaside walls of Quarr Abbey in 1365. Designed for small, trestle-mounted guns.

The pot-de-fer was first depicted in a manuscript, De Nobilitatibus of 1326, by Walter de Millimete, an illuminated manuscript of 1327 that was presented to Edward III upon his accession to the English throne. The manuscript shows a large vase lying on a table, with an armored man behind it holding a rudimentary linstock near the bottom (in this case the linstock would have held a red-hot wire, heated in a brazier, rather than a slow match). A bolt, called a garrot, protrudes from the muzzle. Although illustrated in the treatise, no explanation or description was given.

An early reference to the name in French is as pot de fer a traire garros (an iron jug for throwing arrows). Such a 'pot de fer' had a bottle shape, which may have suggested its name. The pot-de-fer was used by the French in the Hundred Years' War in a raid on Southampton and in battles in Périgord, Cambrai, and Quesnoy. They may also have been used against the Scottish by the English. The first confirmed usage of a pot-de-fer in Germany was during the Eltz Feud between 1331 and 1337 at a siege of Eltz Castle.

Vase-shaped cannons were likely common in this early period. However, only very few 14th-century guns are known from the archaeological record. One example is the Loshult gun, which is very similar to the gun depicted in Milemete's miniature: it is vase-shaped, weighs only 9 kilogram and is 30 centimeter long. Cannons do not feature in European art between 1326/7 and the end of the 14th century, while written sources of this period rarely describe their shape. What seems clear is that cannons remained very small until the middle of the 14th century, weighing on average about eleven kilogram, with some bigger outliers. Afterwards their size increased slightly, but giant bombards weighing hundreds of kilogram were not built until from 1375 onward. After 1430 they had become so powerful that they routinely destroyed castle walls.

Early cannons had several advantages compared to the springald, which was essentially a giant crossbow that was used as a antipersonell weapon. They were easier to transport, more durable, had a much longer range, the smoke and noise they caused had a (shortlived) effect on the enemy's morale and were also much cheaper: in a list of purchased weapons from 1353 a cannon weighing 16 kilogram cost only a fifth of a springald. On the other hand they were very inaccurate and expensive to operate due to the high cost of gunpowder in the 14th century.

When vase guns finally fell out of use in favour of tube-shaped ones remains unclear.

== Scholarly interest and research ==
The unusual vase-like shape of the cannon, coupled with the depicted arrow projectile, caused many modern historians to doubt the efficiency — or even existence — of the weapon. In order to establish these points, researchers at the Royal Armouries reconstructed and trialled the weapon in 1999. The walls of the chamber were very thick to prevent explosion, leaving a cylindrical bore which was loaded by a wooden arrow with bronze flights (also reconstructed based on archeological findings), of 135 cm length. Estimating the size of the cannon from the illustrated man standing beside it, the reconstructed cannon was 90 cm long, and 40 cm at its widest point; cast in bronze the reconstruction weighed 410 kg. The subsequent trials showed that the gun was not powerful, firing the arrow only 180 m at most; a larger charge of powder resulted only in the destruction of the arrow.

== See also ==
- Battle of Crécy
- Bombard
- Gunpowder

== Literature ==
- Andrade, Antonio (2017). The Gunpowder Age: China, Military Innovation, and the Rise of the West in World History. Princeton University Press. ISBN 9780691178141.
- Smith, Robert Douglas; DeVries, Kelly (2005). The Artillery of the Dukes of Burgundy, 1363-1477. Boydell Press. ISBN 9781843831624.
- Rogers, Clifford J. (2018). "The Military Revolutions of the Hundred Years War". In Clifford J. Rogers (ed.). The Military Revolution Debate. Readings On The Military Transformation Of Early Modern Europe. pp. 55–94.
- Rogers, Clifford (2019). "Gunpowder Artillery in Europe, 1326–1500: Innovation and Impact". In Ehlers, Robert S. Jr.; Douglas, Sarah K.; Curzon, Daniel P. M. (eds.). Technology, Violence, and War. Brill. pp. 37–71. ISBN 9789004393301.
