= Gargüera de la Vera =

Coordinates: 40°02′N 6°06′W

Gargüera de la Vera, Spain
- municipality
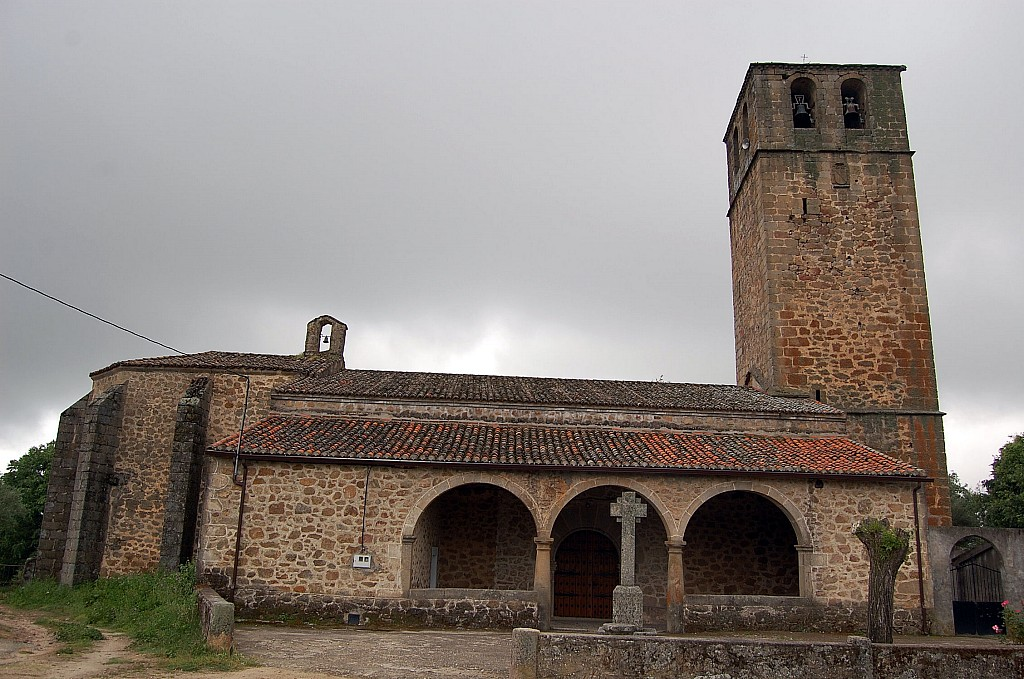
- Church of Gargüera de la Vera

- Flag Coat of arms
- Interactive map of Gargüera de la Vera, Spain
- Country: Spain
- Autonomous community: Extremadura
- Province: Cáceres
- Municipality: Gargüera de la Vera

Area
  - Total: 52 km^{2} (20 sq mi)
- Elevation: 501 m (1,644 ft)

Population (2025-01-01)
  - Total: 187
  - Density: 3.6/km^{2} (9.3/sq mi)
- Time zone: UTC+1 (CET)

Gargüera de la Vera is a municipality located in the province of Cáceres in the autonomous community of Extremadura, Spain. According to the 2006 census (INE), the municipality had a population of 151 inhabitants, which had shrunk to 128 people by 2018 according to the INE's figures for that year, but had grown to 176 by 2023. The municipality covers an area of 123 square kilometres (47 sq mi).

== See also ==
- List of municipalities in Cáceres
