= Garganta la Olla =

Garganta la Olla, Spain
- municipality
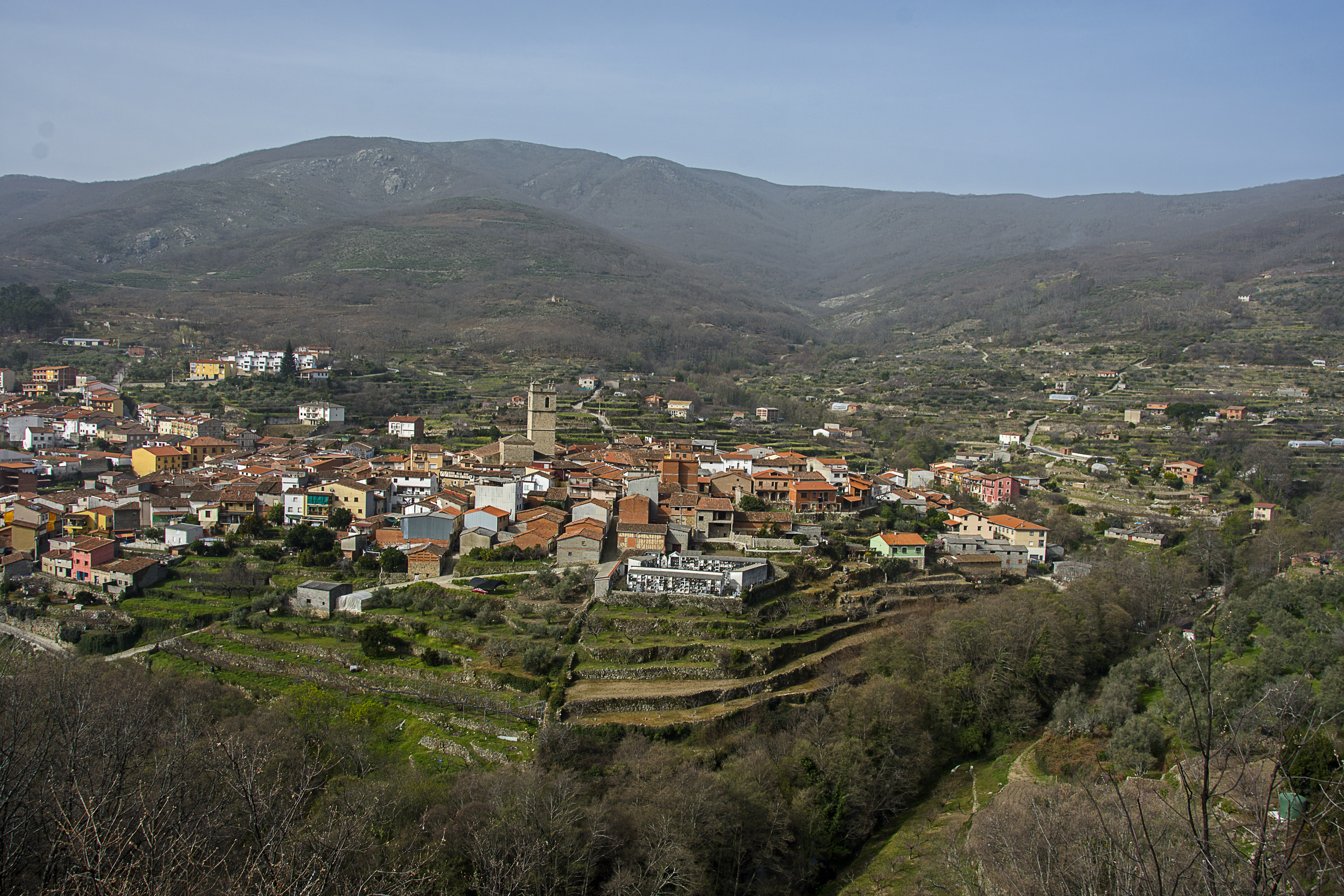
- Garganta La Olla

- Flag Coat of arms
- Interactive map of Garganta la Olla, Spain
- Coordinates: 40°06′N 5°46′W
- Country: Spain
- Autonomous community: Extremadura
- Province: Cáceres
- Municipality: Garganta la Olla

Area
  - Total: 48 km^{2} (19 sq mi)
- Elevation: 590 m (1,940 ft)

Population (2025-01-01)
  - Total: 874
  - Density: 18/km^{2} (47/sq mi)
- Time zone: UTC+1 (CET)
  - Summer (DST): UTC+2 (CEST)

Garganta la Olla is a municipality located in the province of Cáceres, Extremadura, Spain. According to the 2005 census (INE), the municipality has a population of 1,152 inhabitants.

== See also ==
- List of municipalities in Cáceres
