= Madrigal de la Vera =

Madrigal de la Vera, Spain
- municipality
- Flag Coat of arms
- Interactive map of Madrigal de la Vera, Spain
- Coordinates: 40°58′N 5°22′W
- Country: Spain
- Autonomous community: Extremadura
- Province: Cáceres
- Municipality: Madrigal de la Vera

Area
  - Total: 42 km^{2} (16 sq mi)
- Elevation: 401 m (1,316 ft)

Population (2025-01-01)
  - Total: 1,536
  - Density: 37/km^{2} (95/sq mi)
- Time zone: UTC+1 (CET)
  - Summer (DST): UTC+2 (CEST)

Madrigal de la Vera is a municipality located in the province of Cáceres, Extremadura, Spain. According to the 2005 census (INE), the municipality has a population of 1734 inhabitants.

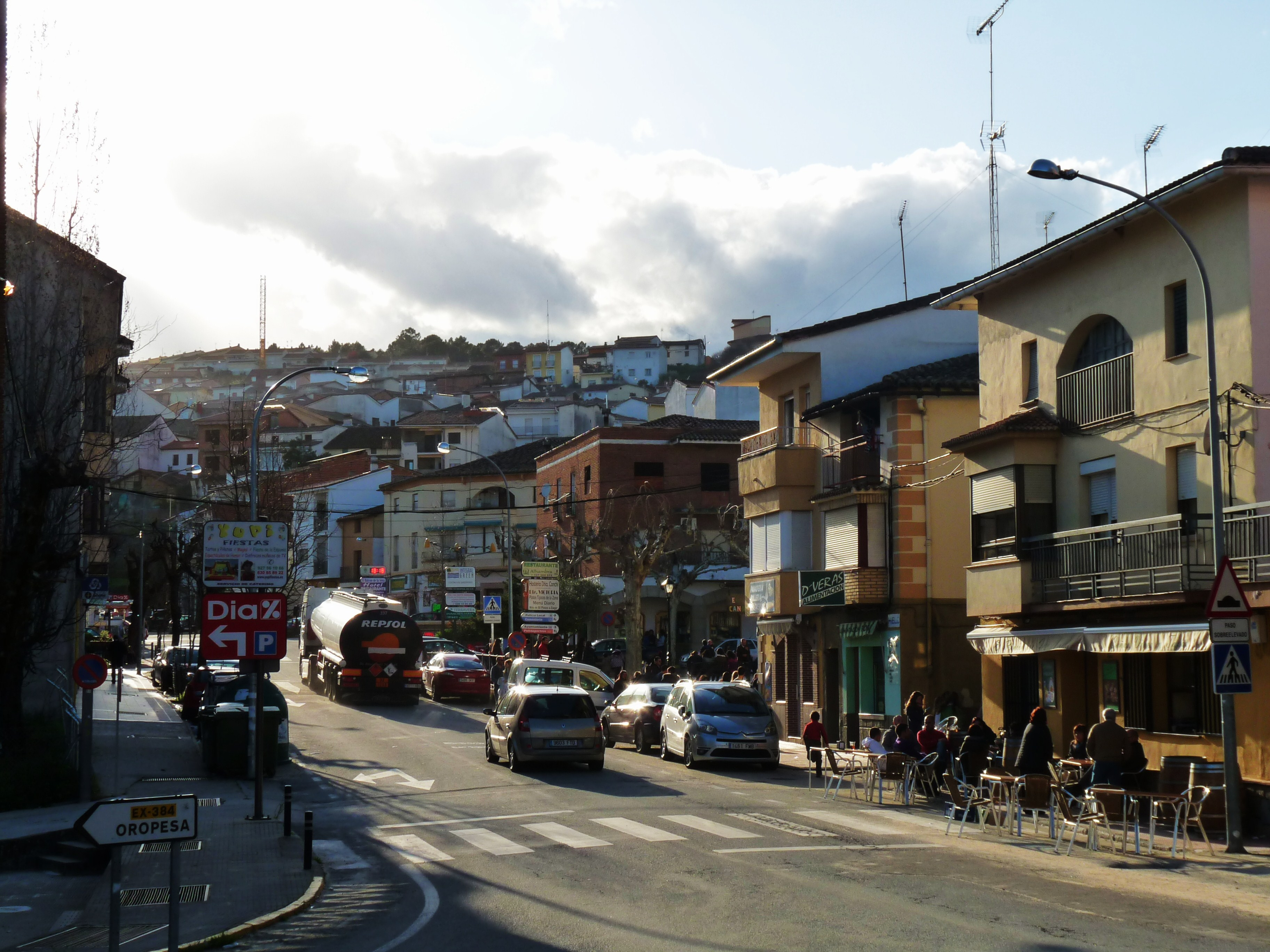
View of Madrigal de la Vera

== See also ==
- List of municipalities in Cáceres
