= Arroyomolinos de la Vera =

Coordinates: 40°03′N 5°51′W

- Coat of arms

- Location in Spain.
- Country: Spain
- Autonomous community: Cáceres

Area
  - Total: 23.19 km^{2} (8.95 sq mi)
- Elevation: 617 m (2,024 ft)

Population (2025-01-01)
  - Total: 424
  - Density: 18.3/km^{2} (47.4/sq mi)
- Time zone: UTC+1 (CET)
  - Summer (DST): UTC+2 (CEST)
- Website: http://www.arroyomolinosdelavera.es/

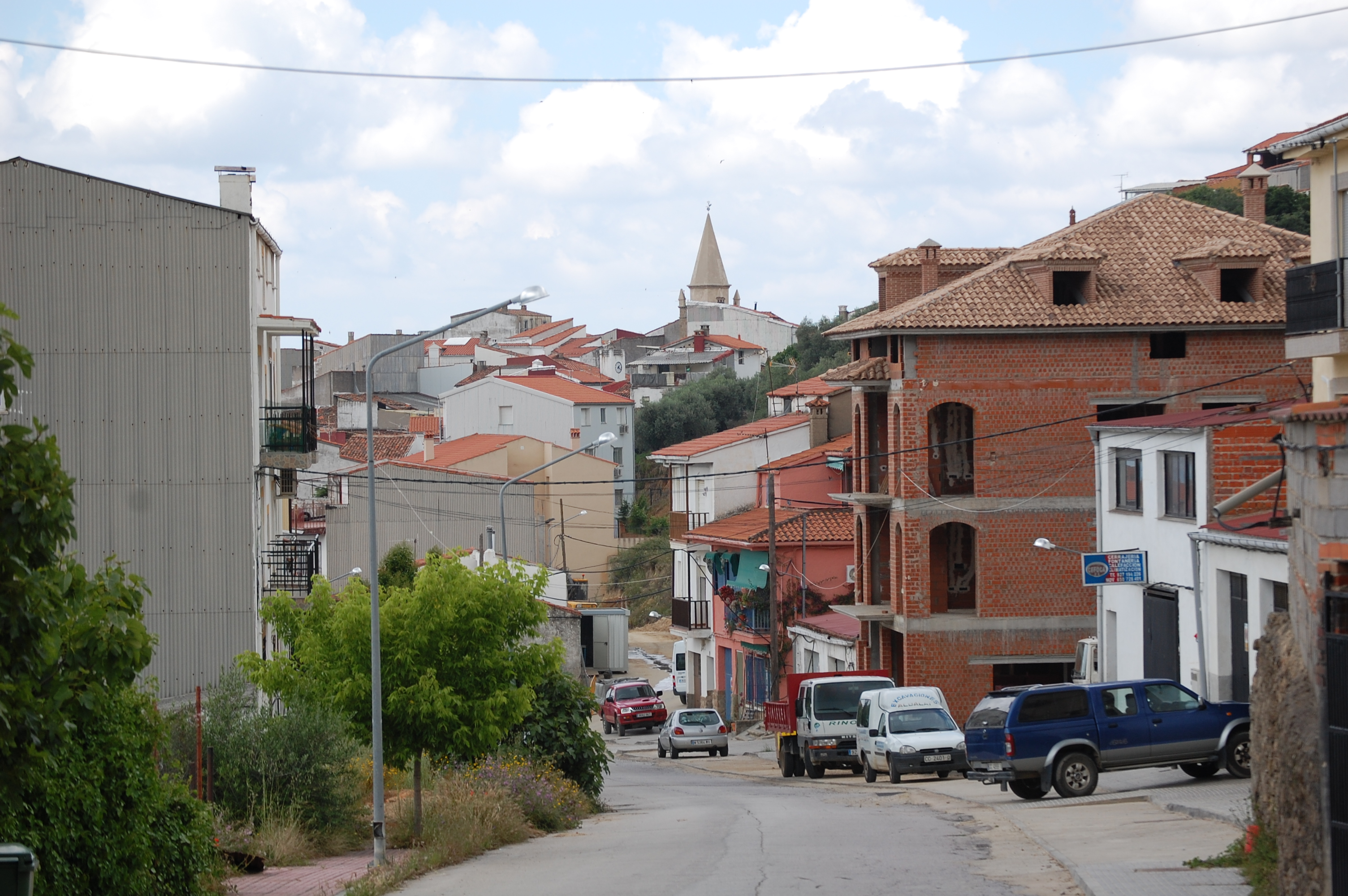
Street of Arroyomolinos de la Vera

Arroyomolinos de la Vera (Extremaduran: Arroyumolinus de la Vera) is a municipality in the province of Cáceres and autonomous community of Extremadura, Spain. The municipality covers an area of 23 square kilometres (8.9 sq mi) and as of 2011 had a population of 486 people.

== See also ==
- List of municipalities in Cáceres
