= Pasarón de la Vera =

- Municipality
- Flag Coat of arms

- Location within Spain Location within Extremadura
- Coordinates: 40°3′7″N 5°49′16″W
- Country: Spain
- Autonomous community: Extremadura
- Province: Cáceres
- Municipality: Pasarón de la Vera

Government
  - Mayor: Samuel Martin García

Area
  - Total: 40 km^{2} (15 sq mi)
- Elevation: 598 m (1,962 ft)

Population (2025-01-01)
  - Total: 588
  - Density: 15/km^{2} (38/sq mi)
- Time zone: UTC+1 (CET)
  - Summer (DST): UTC+2 (CEST)
- Postal code: 10411
- Website: www.pasarondelavera.es

Pasarón de la Vera is a municipality located in the province of Cáceres, Extremadura, Spain. According to the 2005 census (INE), the municipality has a population of 725 inhabitants.

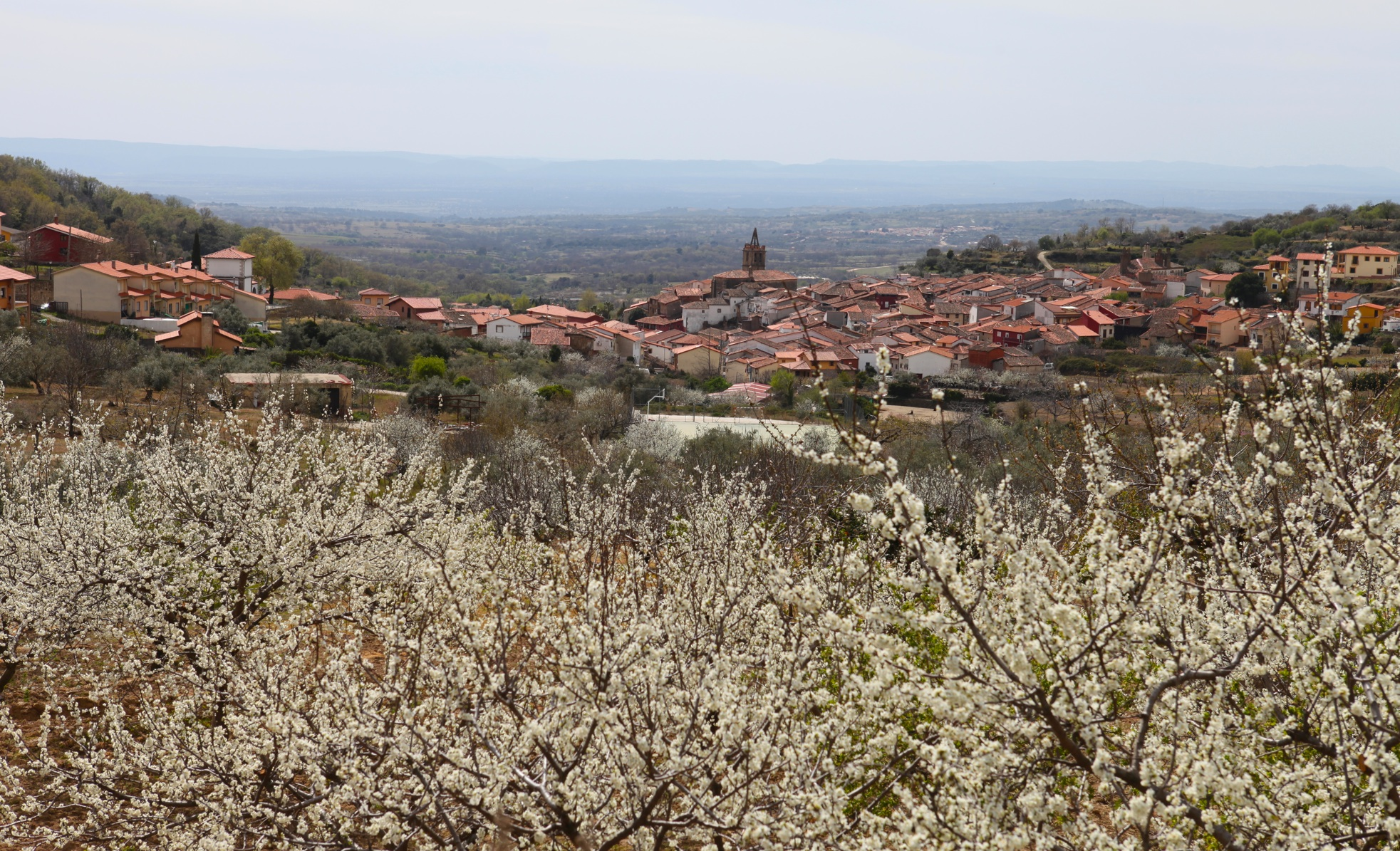
View of Pasarón de La Vera

== See also ==
- List of municipalities in Cáceres
