= Valverde de la Vera =

Valverde de la Vera, Spain
- municipality
- Coat of arms
- Interactive map of Valverde de la Vera, Spain
- Coordinates: 40°07′N 5°29′W
- Country: Spain
- Autonomous community: Extremadura
- Province: Cáceres
- Municipality: Valverde de la Vera

Area
  - Total: 47 km^{2} (18 sq mi)
- Elevation: 509 m (1,670 ft)

Population (2025-01-01)
  - Total: 428
  - Density: 9.1/km^{2} (24/sq mi)
- Time zone: UTC+1 (CET)
  - Summer (DST): UTC+2 (CEST)

Valverde de la Vera is a municipality located in the province of Cáceres, Extremadura, Spain. According to the 2005 census (INE), the municipality has a population of 618 inhabitants.

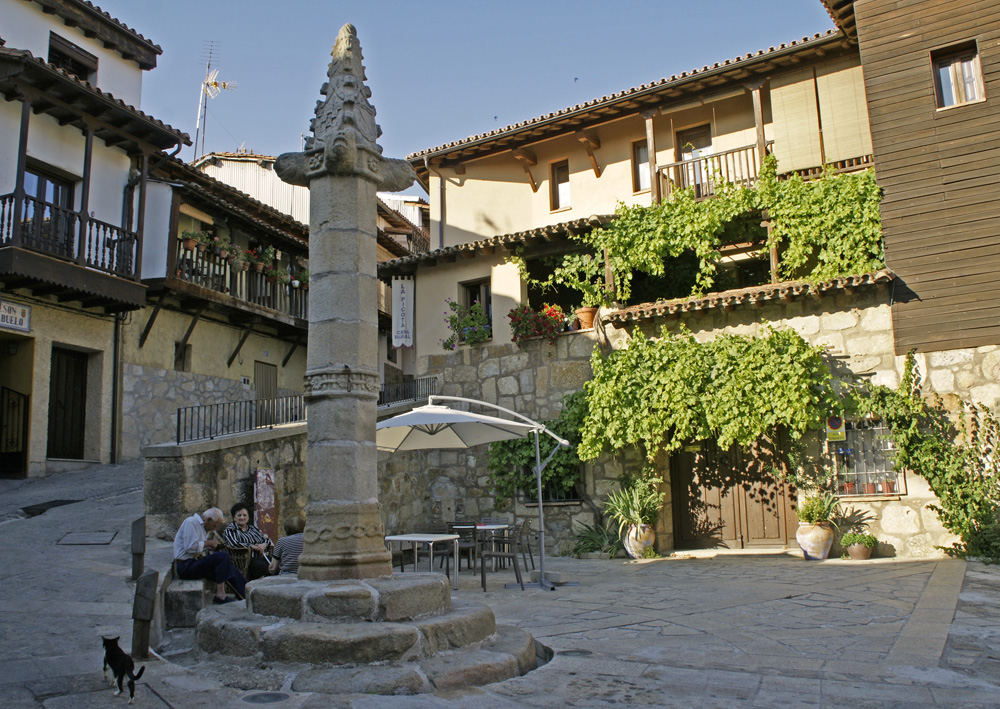
The square where the Picota of Valverde de la Vera is located

== See also ==
- List of municipalities in Cáceres
