= Talaveruela de la Vera =

Talaveruela de la Vera, Spain
- municipality
- Coat of arms

- Location in Spain
- Coordinates: 40.1211°N 5.5197°W
- Country: Spain
- Autonomous community: Extremadura
- Province: Cáceres
- Municipality: Talaveruela de la Vera

Area
  - Total: 21 km^{2} (8.1 sq mi)
- Elevation: 562 m (1,844 ft)

Population (2025-01-01)
  - Total: 303
  - Density: 14/km^{2} (37/sq mi)
- Time zone: UTC+1 (CET)
  - Summer (DST): UTC+2 (CEST)

Talaveruela de la Vera is a municipality located in the province of Cáceres, Extremadura, Spain. According to the 2006 census (INE), the municipality has a population of 378 inhabitants.

== See also ==
- List of municipalities in Cáceres
