= Óscar Fernández (politician) =

Spanish politician (born 1975/76)

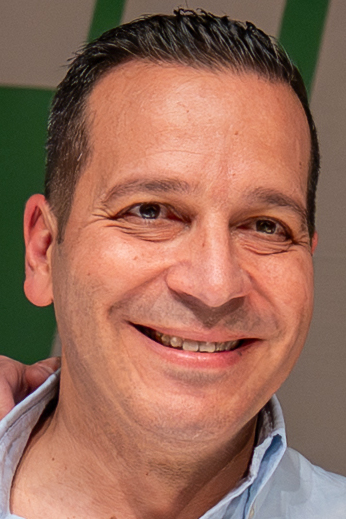

Óscar Arturo Fernández Calle (born 1975 or 1976) is a Spanish politician of the party Vox. He was elected to the Assembly of Extremadura in 2023 and was named his party's lead candidate in 2025. His party rose from five to 11 seats, and he was named vice president of the Regional Government of Extremadura in a coalition led by María Guardiola of the People's Party.

== Biography ==
Born in Cáceres in Extremadura, Fernández is married and has two children as of 2023. He has a degree in nursing from the University of Extremadura and a master's degree in marketing. As of 2023, he was regional manager for a multinational pharmaceutical company.

Fernández became president of Vox in the Province of Cáceres in 2019, and was their lead candidate for Senate of Spain in the Cáceres constituency in that November's general election.

At the start of 2023, Fernández was named as Vox's lead candidate for the Assembly of Extremadura in the Cáceres constituency, ahead of elections in May. He was one of six members elected from his party.

On 11 November 2025, Vox's national executive announced that Fernández would be the party's lead candidate for snap elections in Extremadura the following month. The previous list leader, Ángel Pelayo Gordillo, was set to lead the party in the Senate. Vox rose from five to 11 seats in the legislature.

Vox voted against the investiture of incumbent President of the Regional Government of Extremadura, María Guardiola, in March 2026. The following month, Vox sealed a pact with her People's Party (PP) in which Fernández would be vice president and in charge of the Ministry of Family, Deregulation and Social Services, as well as Vox controlling the Ministry of Agriculture, Farming and Environment, and having the Senate seat assigned by the Assembly.
