= 2025 Extremaduran regional election =

Election in the Spanish region of Extremadura

- 21 December 2025

All 65 seats in the Assembly of Extremadura 33 seats needed for a majority
- Opinion polls
- Registered: 891,038 ▲0.1%
- Turnout: 541,726 (60.8%) ▼9.6 pp
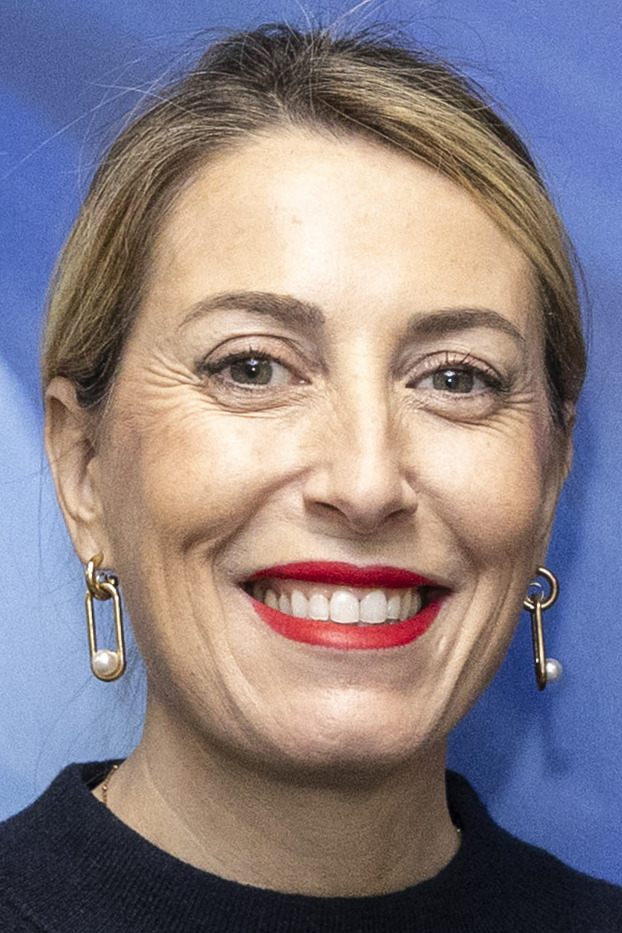

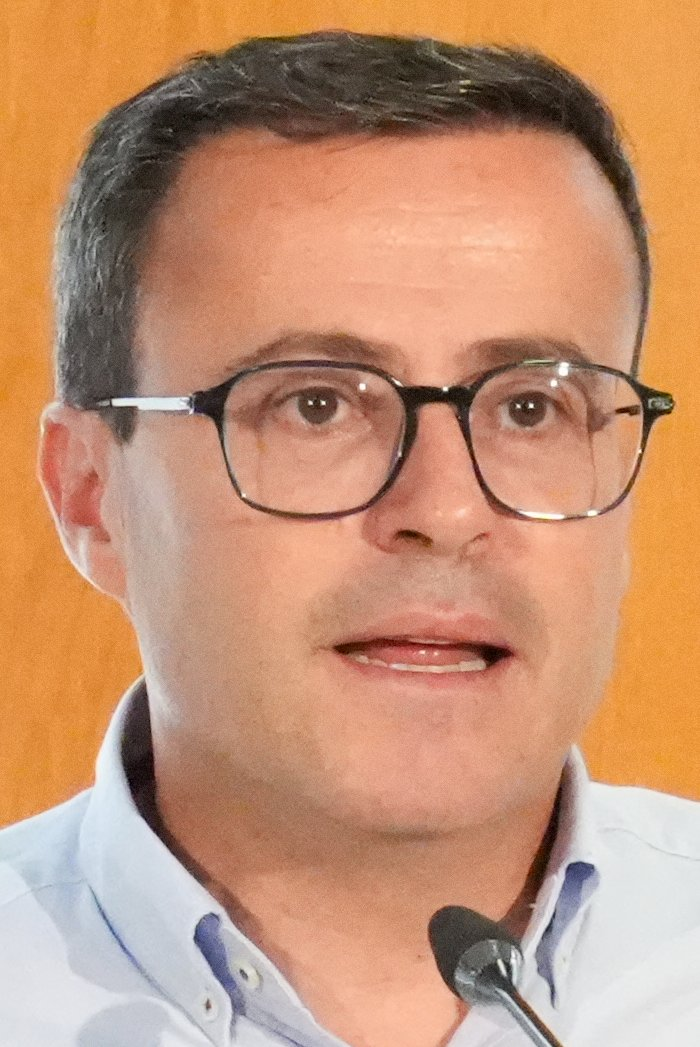

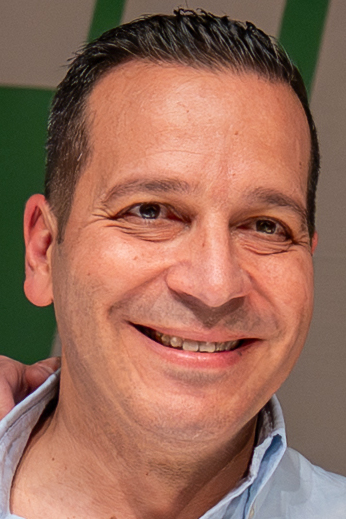

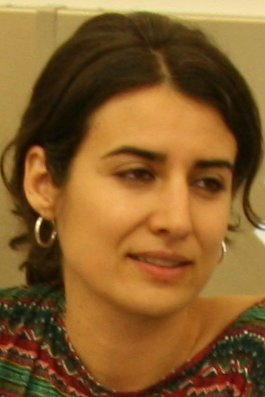
	First party	Second party	Third party
Leader	María Guardiola	Miguel Ángel Gallardo	Óscar Fernández
Party	PP	PSOE	Vox
Leader since	16 July 2022	23 March 2024	11 November 2025
Leader's seat	Cáceres	Badajoz	Cáceres
Last election	28 seats, 38.8%	28 seats, 39.9%	5 seats, 8.1%
Seats won	29	18	11
Seat change	▲1	▼10	▲6
Popular vote	228,991	136,838	89,768
Percentage	43.1%	25.8%	16.9%
Swing	▲4.3 pp	▼14.1 pp	▲8.8 pp
	Fourth party
Leader	Irene de Miguel
Party	Podemos–IU–AV
Leader since	27 November 2018
Leader's seat	Badajoz
Last election	4 seats, 6.0%
Seats won	7
Seat change	▲3
Popular vote	54,541
Percentage	10.3%
Swing	▲4.3 pp
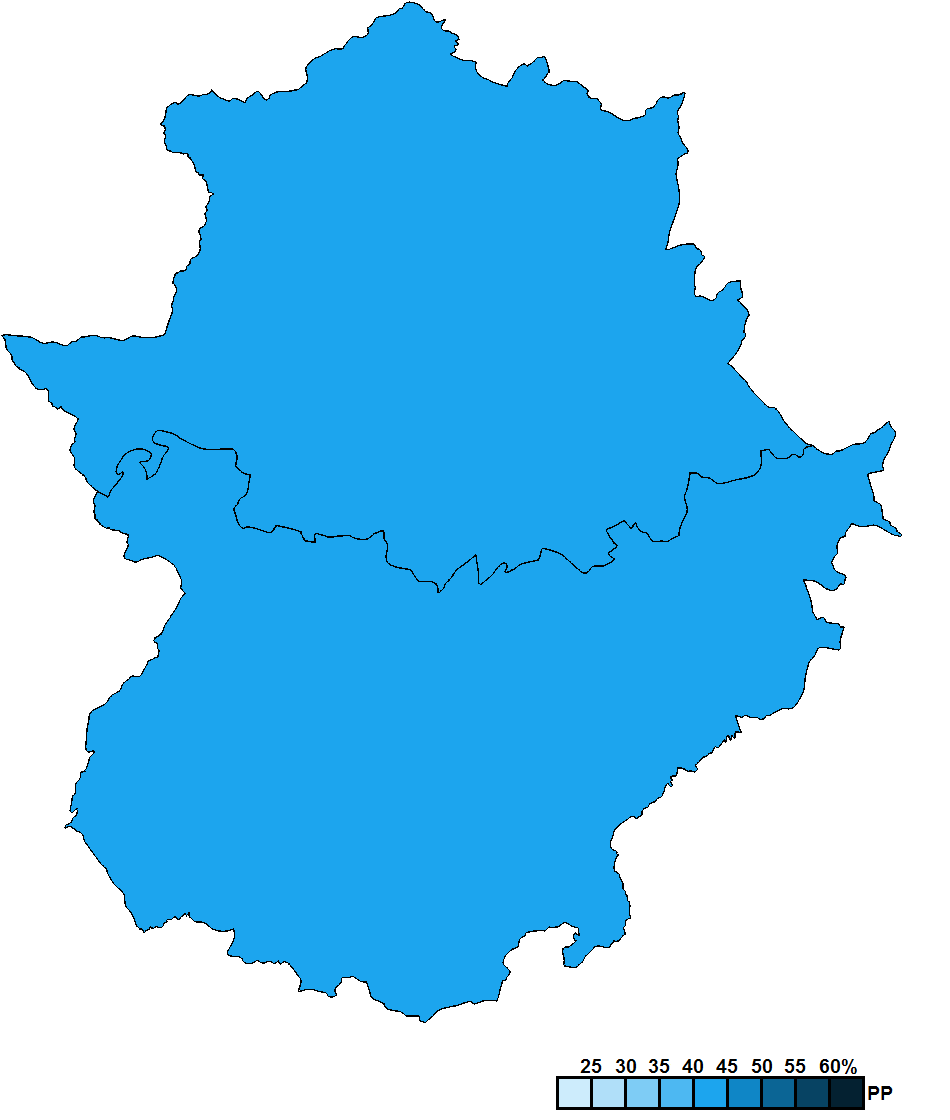
- Constituency results map for the Assembly of Extremadura
President before election
María Guardiola
PP
President after election
María Guardiola
PP

A regional election was held in Extremadura on 21 December 2025 to elect the 12th Assembly of the autonomous community. All 65 seats in the Assembly were up for election. This marked the first time that an Extremaduran president exercised the legal prerogative to call a snap election.

The 2023 election had seen the People's Party (PP) and the far-right Vox party form a coalition under the presidency of María Guardiola, but not before she was forced to backtrack after having pledged not to let the latter into her cabinet. The Spanish Socialist Workers' Party (PSOE), who was ousted from power only for the second time in history, saw a leadership change from Guillermo Fernández Vara—who died from stomach cancer in October 2025—to the then-president of the provincial deputation of Badajoz, Miguel Ángel Gallardo. The PP–Vox coalition collapsed in July 2024 over a strategic movement from the latter's national leadership, with Guardiola leading a minority government from that point onwards. Amid growing tensions with Vox, unable to pass her 2026 budget through parliament and seeking to capitalize on various corruption probes affecting the national government under Prime Minister Pedro Sánchez, Guardiola called an early election in what became the first of a series of regional elections held in PP-controlled regions.

Political stability and the continuity of the Almaraz Nuclear Power Plant were seen as key themes going into the election and in ensuing negotiations. The campaign was shaken by a string of sexual misconduct allegations—particularly the Salazar affair affecting the ruling PSOE in Spain, and accusations against Guardiola's official driver and the PP's local mayor in Navalmoral de la Mata—as well as by a theft in a postal office that saw the PP spread suspicions of electoral fraud. The election resulted in the PSOE's worst historical result in the region, with the demobilization of part of its electorate as it lost 10 of its 28 seats, in what was attributed both to a punishment of Gallardo and to growing discontent with Sánchez's national government. Guardiola's PP, while having a strong performance, fell well short of its goal of securing an overall majority of 33, remaining dependant on support from a resurgent Vox, which doubled its results. The left-wing United for Extremadura alliance, comprising Podemos and allies of Sumar (PSOE's ruling partner in Spain), benefitted from the Socialist collapse and obtained its best historical result. The combined vote for right-wing parties was 60%, which was the highest in history, albeit under the lowest voter turnout since the first regional election in 1983.

A political deadlock ensued as government formation negotiations between PP and Vox failed to deliver a deal, resulting in a failed investiture attempt by Guardiola in March 2026. As a result, the scenario of a repeat election taking place in 28 June—if no government is elected before 4 May—remains a possibility.

== Background ==
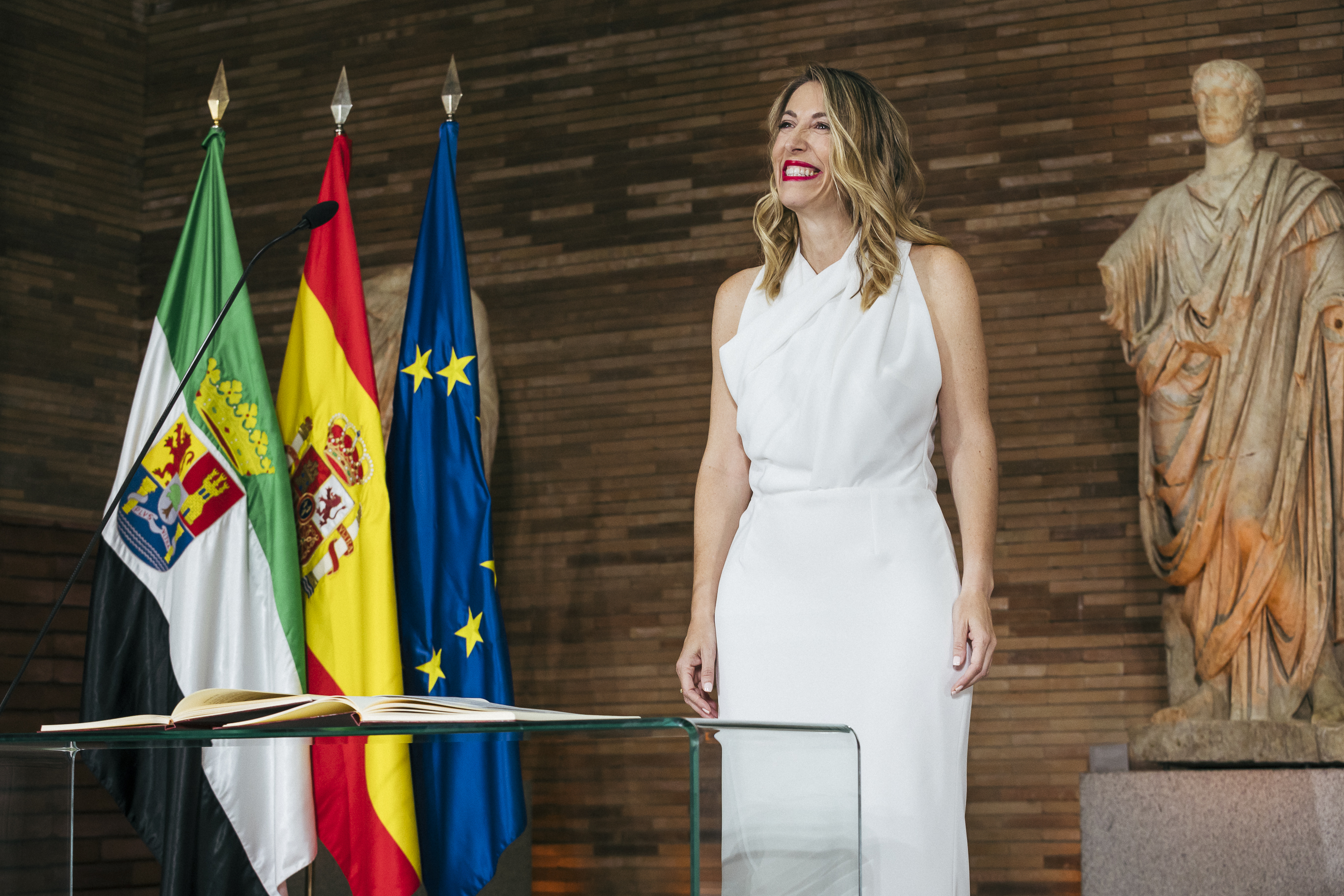
Government negotiations in 2023 saw the regional PP leader, María Guardiola, backtrack on her pledge not to form a coalition with the far-right Vox party.

The 2023 regional election saw a parliamentary majority for the People's Party (PP) and the far-right Vox party, despite the Spanish Socialist Workers' Party (PSOE) remaining the largest overall. PP candidate María Guardiola's initial refusal to form a coalition government with Vox led to several weeks of public clashes—seeing Guardiola herself proclaiming that she could not allow "those who deny gender-based violence, who use bold strokes, dehumanize immigrants and display a banner on which they throw the LGTBI flag into a trash can" into her government—and in the PSOE and United for Extremadura (the alliance between Podemos and United Left) retaining control of the Assembly's bureau as the PP and Vox voted for their own candidates. Ultimately, Guardiola was forced to U-turn and form a PP–Vox cabinet by her own party's national leadership, then embroiled in the 23 July 2023 general election campaign. This political episode was said to have contributed to the PP's failure to meet expectations in the general election by evidencing the party's willingness to allow the far-right into government despite public pledges to the contrary.

Guillermo Fernández Vara, who had been president of Extremadura from 2007 to 2011 and again from 2015 to 2023, announced his withdrawal from regional politics after failing to secure investiture, being proposed as a senator instead. In December 2023, Vara announced that he was suffering from stomach cancer, which ultimately led to his death in October 2025. Miguel Ángel Gallardo, president of the provincial deputation of Badajoz and regarded as a critic of Prime Minister Pedro Sánchez's leadership, was elected in March 2024 as Vara's successor at the helm of the regional PSOE branch. In May 2025, Gallardo was indicted on charges of perverting the course of justice and influence peddling related to the allegedly illegal hiring in 2017 of Sánchez's brother in the deputation he presided over. He denied any wrongdoing and suggested that he was the target of a lawfare campaign, but his public standing was damaged by his seeking of parliamentary immunity, in a move that the High Court of Justice of Extremadura deemed to be law evasion.

On 11 July 2024, Vox's national leader Santiago Abascal forced the break up of all PP–Vox regional governments over a controversy regarding the nationwide distribution of unaccompanied migrant minors among the autonomous communities. Vox's single regional minister in Guardiola's cabinet, Ignacio Higuero, quit the party in order to preserve his office, though his involvement in a resume padding scandal eventually led to his resignation in August 2025. Budget negotiations in the autumn of 2025 hinted at the possibility of Guardiola calling a snap election for early next year in the event of a parliamentary deadlock, which she ultimately did in an attempt to take advantage of internal polling showing a weak opposition.

== Overview ==
Under the 2011 Statute of Autonomy, the Assembly of Extremadura was the unicameral legislature of the homonymous autonomous community, having legislative power in devolved matters, as well as the ability to grant or withdraw confidence from a regional president. The electoral and procedural rules were supplemented by national law provisions.

=== Date ===
The term of the Assembly of Extremadura expired four years after the date of its previous election, unless it was dissolved earlier. The election decree was required to be issued no later than 25 days before the scheduled expiration date of parliament and published on the following day in the Official Journal of Extremadura (DOE), with election day taking place 54 days after the decree's publication. The previous election was held on 28 May 2023, which meant that the chamber's term would have expired on 28 May 2027. The election decree was required to be published in the DOE no later than 4 May 2027, setting the latest possible date for election day on 27 June 2027.

The regional president had the prerogative to dissolve the Assembly of Extremadura at any given time and call a snap election, provided that no motion of no confidence was in process and that dissolution did not occur before one year after a previous one. In the event of an investiture process failing to elect a regional president within a two-month period from the first ballot, the Assembly was to be automatically dissolved and a fresh election called.

The political deadlock resulting from the 2023 election result, in which no single party secured an absolute majority of seats, was briefly commented as potentially leading to a repeat election as PP's María Guardiola opposed letting the far-right Vox into government. Guardiola eventually bowed to political pressure from her party at the national level and signed a coalition agreement with Vox, being elected as regional president on 14 July 2023 and dashing any prospect of an imminent early election. The possibility of an early election call was again floated in late 2024, after Vox's split with her government left Guardiola in a minority and unable to get her 2025 budget passed through parliament, but this attempt ultimately failed to materialize.

Guardiola threatened in September 2025 with a snap election if opposition parties blocked her government's 2026 budget. Speculation then emerged that the national leadership of the People's Party (PP) was planning to advance the elections in Aragon and Extremadura (and possibly the Balearic Islands) to make them take place near or concurrently with the Castilian-Leonese election scheduled for early 2026. While the alleged justification would be the regional governments' failure to approve their 2026 budgets, the true motive was attributed to PP plans—not without risk—to turn the simultaneous election call into a referendum on the national government of Prime Minister Pedro Sánchez. The regional PP ruled out any plans for a joint election call and defended their president's "full freedom" to make her independent decisions. After PSOE and Vox hinted at voting down Guardiola's budget, she announced the parliament's dissolution on 27 October, with the election being scheduled for 21 December 2025.

The Assembly of Extremadura was officially dissolved on 28 October 2025 with the publication of the corresponding decree in the DOE, setting election day for 21 December.

=== Electoral system ===
Voting for the Assembly was based on universal suffrage, comprising all Spanish nationals over 18 years of age, registered in Extremadura and with full political rights, provided that they had not been deprived of the right to vote by a final sentence.

The Assembly of Extremadura had a maximum of 65 seats, with electoral provisions fixing its size at that number. All were elected in two multi-member constituencies—corresponding to the provinces of Badajoz and Cáceres, each of which was assigned an initial minimum of 20 seats and the remaining 25 distributed in proportion to population—using the D'Hondt method and closed-list proportional voting, with a five percent-threshold of valid votes (including blank ballots) in each constituency. Alternatively, parties could also enter the seat distribution as long as they ran candidates in both constituencies and reached five percent regionally.

As a result of the aforementioned allocation, each Assembly constituency was entitled the following seats:

Seats	Constituencies
36	Badajoz
29	Cáceres

The law did not provide for by-elections to fill vacant seats; instead, any vacancies arising after the proclamation of candidates and during the legislative term were filled by the next candidates on the party lists or, when required, by designated substitutes.

=== Outgoing parliament ===
The table below shows the composition of the parliamentary groups in the chamber at the time of dissolution.

Parliamentary composition in October 2025
Groups	Parties	Legislators	
Groups	Parties	Seats	Total
Socialist Parliamentary Group	PSOE	28	28
People's Parliamentary Group	PP	28	28
Vox Extremadura Parliamentary Group	Vox	5	5
United for Extremadura; Parliamentary Group	Podemos	3	4
United for Extremadura; Parliamentary Group	IU	1	4

== Parties and candidates ==
The electoral law allowed for parties and federations registered in the interior ministry, alliances and groupings of electors to present lists of candidates. Parties and federations intending to form an alliance were required to inform the relevant electoral commission within 10 days of the election call, whereas groupings of electors needed to secure the signature of at least two percent of the electorate in the constituencies for which they sought election, disallowing electors from signing for more than one list. Amendments in 2024 required a balanced composition of men and women in the electoral lists through the use of a zipper system.

Below is a list of the main parties and alliances which contested the election:

Candidacy	Parties and alliances	Candidate	Ideology	Previous result		Gov.	Ref.
Candidacy	Parties and alliances	Candidate	Ideology	Vote %	Seats	Gov.	Ref.
PSOE	List: Spanish Socialist Workers' Party (PSOE)	Miguel Ángel Gallardo	Social democracy	39.9%	28	No	
PP	List: People's Party (PP)	María Guardiola	Conservatism; Christian democracy	38.8%	28	Yes	
Vox	List: Vox (Vox)	Óscar Fernández	Right-wing populism Ultranationalism; National conservatism	8.1%	5	No	
Podemos– IU–AV	List: We Can (Podemos); United Left (IU) – Communist Party of Extremadura (PCEx) – The Dawn Marxist Organization (La Aurora (OM)) – Republican Left (IR); Green Alliance (AV); Unite Movement (SMR) (Note: Unofficially.)	Irene de Miguel	Left-wing populism Direct democracy Democratic socialism	6.0%	4	No	

== Campaign ==
=== Timetable ===
The key dates are listed below (all times are CET):

- 27 October: The election decree is issued with the countersign of the president, after deliberation in the Regional Government.
- 28 October: Formal dissolution of parliament and start of prohibition period on the inauguration of public works, services or projects.
- 31 October: Initial constitution of provincial and zone electoral commissions with judicial members.
- 3 November: Division of constituencies into polling sections and stations.
- 7 November: Deadline for parties and federations to report on their electoral alliances.
- 10 November: Deadline for electoral register consultation for the purpose of possible corrections.
- 17 November: Deadline for parties, federations, alliances, and groupings of electors to present electoral lists.
- 19 November: Publication of submitted electoral lists in the Official Journal of Extremadura (DOE).
- 24 November: Official proclamation of validly submitted electoral lists.
- 25 November: Publication of proclaimed electoral lists in the DOE.
- 26 November: Deadline for the selection of polling station members by sortition.
- 4 December: Deadline for the appointment of non-judicial members to provincial and zone electoral commissions.
- 5 December: Official start of electoral campaigning.
- 11 December: Deadline to apply for postal voting.
- 16 December: Start of legal ban on electoral opinion polling publication; deadline for non-resident citizens (electors residing abroad (CERA) and citizens temporarily absent from Spain) to vote by mail.
- 17 December: Deadline for postal and temporarily absent voting.
- 18 December: Deadline for CERA voting.
- 19 December: Last day of electoral campaigning.
- 20 December: Official election silence ("reflection day").
- 21 December: Election day (polling stations open at 9 am and close at 8 pm or once voters present in a queue at/outside the polling station at 8 pm have cast their vote); provisional vote counting.
- 26 December: Start of general vote counting, including CERA votes.
- 29 December: Deadline for the general vote counting.
- 7 January: Deadline for the proclamation of elected members.
- 20 January: Deadline for the reconvening of parliament.
- 16 February: Deadline for the publication of definitive election results in the DOE.

=== Party slogans ===
Party or alliance	Original slogan	English translation	Ref.
PSOE	« Hazlo o lo harán »	"Do it or they will"	
PP	« Más confianza. Más Extremadura »	"More confidence. More Extremadura"	
Vox	« Sentido común »	"Common sense"	
UxE	« La fuerza de Extremadura »	"The force/strength of Extremadura" (Note: The slogan plays with the meaning of fuerza, which in English translates both as "force" and "strength".)	

=== Debates ===
RTVE proposed holding an election debate between the main candidates of the parties with parliamentary representation. Regional president María Guardiola rejected attending after criticizing the invitation as a "political strategy" by the government of Spain, but PSOE, Vox and UxE confirmed their participation, with the debate being scheduled regardless of Guardiola's participation. On 4 December, the PP confirmed that no party member would attend the debate.

2025 Extremaduran regional election debates
Date	Organizer(s)	Moderator(s)	P Present (Note: Denotes a main invitee attending the event.) S Surrogate (Note: Denotes a main invitee not attending the event, sending a surrogate in their place.) NI Not invited I Invited A Absent invitee											
Date	Organizer(s)	Moderator(s)	PSOE	PP	Vox	UxE	J–L	Cs	UED	M+J	PACMA	NEx	Audience	Ref.
11 December	Canal Extremadura	Manu Pérez	P Gallardo	P Guardiola	P Fernández	P De Miguel	P González	P Segura	P Viera	P Blanco	S Luna	P Rubio	12.1% (40,000)	
18 December	RTVE	Xabier Fortes	P Gallardo	A	P Fernández	P De Miguel	NI	NI	NI	NI	NI	NI	17.7% (65,000)	

== Opinion polls ==
The tables below list opinion polling results in reverse chronological order, showing the most recent first and using the dates when the survey fieldwork was done, as opposed to the date of publication. Where the fieldwork dates are unknown, the date of publication is given instead. The highest percentage figure in each polling survey is displayed with its background shaded in the leading party's colour. If a tie ensues, this is applied to the figures with the highest percentages. The "Lead" column on the right shows the percentage-point difference between the parties with the highest percentages in a poll.

=== Graphical summary ===
Local regression trend line of poll results from 28 May 2023 to 21 December 2025, with each line corresponding to a political party.

=== Voting intention estimates ===
The table below lists weighted voting intention estimates. Refusals are generally excluded from the party vote percentages, while question wording and the treatment of "don't know" responses and those not intending to vote may vary between polling organisations. When available, seat projections determined by the polling organisations are displayed below (or in place of) the percentages in a smaller font; 33 seats were required for an absolute majority in the Assembly of Extremadura.

Color key:

Poll conducted after legal ban on opinion polls

Polling firm/Commissioner	Fieldwork date	Sample size	Turnout	PSOE	PP	Vox	UxE	JUEx	Cs	Podemos	Sumar	Lead
2025 regional election	21 Dec 2025	—N/a	60.8	25.8; 18	43.1; 29	16.9; 11	10.3; 7	0.8; 0	0.2; 0	(Note: Within UxE.)		17.3
Sigma Dos/El Mundo	21 Dec 2025	?	?	24.7; 16/18	44.9; 30/32	15.3; 9/11	11.5; 7/8	–	–			20.2
SocioMétrica/El Español	19–20 Dec 2025	?	?	24.6; 16/18	42.5; 30/32	15.4; 9/11	11.0; 7	3.0; 0	–			17.9
SocioMétrica/El Español	15 Dec 2025	1,000	?	28.5; 19/21	43.9; 30/32	12.9; 8/9	7.9; 4/5	3.2; 0/1	–			15.4
Data10/Okdiario	12–15 Dec 2025	1,500	?	27.5; 19	44.7; 32	13.5; 9	9.5; 5	–	–			17.2
Target Point/El Debate	11–14 Dec 2025	1,002	?	26.9; 18/20	43.7; 30/32	14.0; 9/10	10.2; 6/7	–	–			16.8
EM-Analytics/Electomanía	1–14 Dec 2025	1,540	?	30.9; 21	42.8; 30	13.9; 9	7.8; 5	2.9; 0	–			11.9
PP	13 Dec 2025	?	?	? 19/20	? 31/32	? 8/9	? 4/5	–	–			?
Sigma Dos/El Mundo	24 Nov–12 Dec 2025	1,824	70.6	28.7; 19/21	41.9; 28/30	15.7; 9/11	9.3; 5/6	–	–			13.2
40dB/Prisa	5–11 Dec 2025	800	?	31.2; 21/23	41.1; 28/30	14.1; 9/10	8.3; 4/6	–	–			9.9
Celeste-Tel/Onda Cero	4–11 Dec 2025	1,000	?	32.2; 21	42.9; 31	12.8; 8	8.7; 5	1.5; 0	–			10.7
GAD3/ABC	3–11 Dec 2025	1,084	?	27.1; 19/20	43.0; 31/32	12.7; 7/9	10.0; 6	3.0; 0	–			15.9
GESOP/Prensa Ibérica	2–11 Dec 2025	801	64	28.0; 19/21	37.3; 26/28	17.2; 11/13	9.4; 6/7	3.0; 0	–			9.3
DYM/Henneo	4–10 Dec 2025	706	?	31.8; 21/23	42.9; 29/31	12.3; 7/9	8.0; 5/6	–	–			11.1
EM-Analytics/Electomanía	1–7 Dec 2025	850	?	33.8; 23	41.8; 29	13.6; 9	6.8; 4	1.5; 0	–			8.0
SocioMétrica/El Español	4–6 Dec 2025	1,100	?	29.4; 21/22	43.0; 30/32	12.3; 7/9	7.9; 4/5	3.9; 0/1	–			13.6
NC Report/La Razón	2–5 Dec 2025	1,000	67.5	33.1; 22	42.9; 30	11.5; 8	8.0; 5	–	–			9.8
EM-Analytics/Electomanía	30 Oct–30 Nov 2025	1,728	?	34.0; 24	42.1; 29	12.8; 8	6.3; 4	1.7; 0	–			8.1
Sigma Dos/El Mundo	21–27 Nov 2025	1,091	?	32.5; 21/23	42.4; 29/30	13.0; 8/9	7.9; 5	–	–			9.9
CIS	21–25 Nov 2025	2,037	?	31.6; 19/22	38.5; 25/29	17.3; 10/12	9.6; 6/7	0.8; 0	–			6.9
EM-Analytics/Electomanía	30 Oct–23 Nov 2025	1,317	?	35.0; 24	41.8; 29	12.0; 8	6.2; 4	1.6; 0	–			6.8
EM-Analytics/Electomanía	30 Oct–15 Nov 2025	755	?	35.0; 24	41.2; 29	11.8; 8	6.5; 4	–	–			6.2
SyM Consulting	3–7 Nov 2025	2,400	71.3	36.7; 25/26	42.1; 29/30	11.4; 7/8	5.1; 2/3	–	0.6; 0			5.4
Sigma Dos/El Mundo	27–30 Oct 2025	873	?	35.6; 24/26	41.7; 29/30	11.4; 7/8	6.2; 3/4	–	–			6.1
EM-Analytics/Electomanía	27–29 Oct 2025	802	?	35.2; 24	41.6; 30	12.2; 8	6.0; 3	–	0.2; 0			6.4
EM-Analytics/Electomanía	29 Sep–25 Oct 2025	1,295	?	37.9; 26	41.0; 30	12.7; 9	–	–	0.3; 0	1.4; 0	4.5; 0	3.1
NC Report/La Razón	16–31 May 2025	350	?	? 26	? 29	? 6	? 4	–	–			?
EM-Analytics/Electomanía	29 Apr–27 May 2025	1,295	?	40.2; 28	42.1; 30	10.2; 7	–	–	0.3; 0	2.0; 0	3.2; 0	1.9
Sigma Dos/El Mundo	9–22 May 2025	1,028	?	36.7; 25/26	41.8; 29/30	9.3; 6	6.6; 4	3.1; 0	–			5.1
NC Report/La Razón	18–23 Jul 2024	1,000	72.1	39.4; 29	43.5; 32	6.8; 4	–	–	–	2.4; 0	2.9; 0	4.1
2024 EP election	9 Jun 2024	—N/a	46.9	36.6 (27)	41.4 (31)	10.0 (7)	–	0.5 (0)	0.5 (0)	2.2 (0)	2.5 (0)	4.8
EM-Analytics/Electomanía	25 Nov–23 Dec 2023	1,295	?	42.5; 31	36.7; 27	9.0; 6	–	2.0; 0	1.0; 0	0.9; 0	5.0; 1	5.8
2023 general election	23 Jul 2023	—N/a	71.7	39.1 (27)	37.9 (25)	13.6 (9)	–	–	–	(Note: Within Sumar.)	6.9 (4)	1.2
PSOE	22 Jun 2023	?	?	? 30	? 28	? 3/4	? 3/4	–	–		–	?
EM-Analytics/Electomanía	28 May–22 Jun 2023	1,000	?	42.2; 30	37.0; 27	8.5; 5	5.2; 3	2.7; 0	0.9; 0		–	5.2
Data10/Okdiario	21 Jun 2023	1,500	65.8	42.9; 31	41.1; 30	6.6; 4	4.6; 0	–	–		–	1.8
2023 regional election	28 May 2023	—N/a	70.4	39.9; 28	38.8; 28	8.1; 5	6.0; 4	2.5; 0	0.9; 0		–	1.1

=== Voting preferences ===
The table below lists raw, unweighted voting preferences.

Polling firm/Commissioner	Fieldwork date	Sample size	PSOE	PP	Vox	UxE	JUEx	Podemos	Sumar	SALF	Question	X mark	Lead
2025 regional election (Note: Does not include non-resident citizens.)	21 Dec 2025	—N/a	15.8	26.6	10.4	6.3	0.5			–	—N/a	37.3	10.8
SocioMétrica/El Español	15 Dec 2025	1,000	21.0	29.0	13.0	10.0	3.0			–	13.0	7.0	8.0
40dB/Prisa	5–11 Dec 2025	800	17.6	28.7	13.4	9.2	–			–	19.4	5.8	11.1
GESOP/Prensa Ibérica	2–11 Dec 2025	801	16.0	23.7	13.1	9.9	1.9			–	20.7	6.2	7.7
DYM/Henneo	4–10 Dec 2025	706	19.3	23.1	13.1	12.1	11.4			–	21.8	6.6	3.8
SocioMétrica/El Español	4–6 Dec 2025	1,100	20.0	35.0	12.0	7.0	4.0			–	11.0	6.0	15.0
CIS	21–25 Nov 2025	2,037	24.0	30.9	14.2	8.0	0.8			–	15.9	2.6	6.9
CIS	7–31 Mar 2025	442	21.6	27.2	8.8	–	–	1.1	3.1	0.2	27.7	5.0	5.6
2024 EP election	9 Jun 2024	—N/a	17.5	19.8	4.7	–	–	1.1	1.2	1.6	—N/a	51.7	2.3
2023 general election	23 Jul 2023	—N/a	28.3	27.5	9.9	–	–		5.0	–	—N/a	26.3	0.8
2023 regional election	28 May 2023	—N/a	28.2	27.5	5.7	4.2	1.8		–	–	—N/a	27.5	0.7

=== Victory preferences ===
The table below lists opinion polling on the victory preferences for each party in the event of a regional election taking place.

Polling firm/Commissioner	Fieldwork date	Sample size	PSOE	PP	Vox	UxE	JUEx	Other/ None	Question	Lead
CIS	21–25 Nov 2025	2,037	27.9	34.8	14.7	8.5	0.9	5.2	8.2	6.9

=== Victory likelihood ===
The table below lists opinion polling on the perceived likelihood of victory for each party in the event of a regional election taking place.

Polling firm/Commissioner	Fieldwork date	Sample size	PSOE	PP	Vox	UxE	Other/ None	Question	Lead
Sigma Dos/El Mundo	21–27 Nov 2025	1,091	–	70.0	–	–	–	–	?
CIS	21–25 Nov 2025	2,037	20.7	58.3	3.5	0.8	0.6	16.2	37.6
Sigma Dos/El Mundo	27–30 Oct 2025	873	21.8	63.6	–	–	14.6		41.8

=== Preferred President ===
The table below lists opinion polling on leader preferences to become president of the Regional Government of Extremadura.

All candidates

Polling firm/Commissioner	Fieldwork date	Sample size								Other/ None/ Not care	Question	Lead
Polling firm/Commissioner	Fieldwork date	Sample size	Vara PSOE	Gallardo PSOE	Guardiola PP	Gordillo Vox	Fernández Vox	De Miguel UxE	González JUEx	Other/ None/ Not care	Question	Lead
SocioMétrica/El Español	15 Dec 2025	1,000	–	18.4	34.4	–	11.3	12.4	2.3	21.2		16.0
40dB/Prisa	5–11 Dec 2025	800	–	16.6	33.6	–	13.8	12.2	–	12.6	11.3	17.0
GESOP/Prensa Ibérica	2–11 Dec 2025	801	–	12.9	36.9	–	4.6	13.5	0.6	12.6	19.0	23.4
SocioMétrica/El Español	4–6 Dec 2025	1,100	–	19.1	37.6	–	8.9	11.5	0.1	22.8		18.5
CIS	21–25 Nov 2025	2,037	–	21.0	37.3	–	10.5	8.5	1.1	8.5	12.9	16.3
CIS (Note: Responses denoting a party's generic candidate are aggregated to that party's main candidate/leader at the time of the poll.)	7–31 Mar 2025	442	1.2	9.7	26.5	3.3	–	2.5	–	6.0	50.9	16.8

Gallardo vs. Guardiola

Polling firm/Commissioner	Fieldwork date	Sample size			Other/ None/ Not care	Question	Lead
Polling firm/Commissioner	Fieldwork date	Sample size	Gallardo PSOE	Guardiola PP	Other/ None/ Not care	Question	Lead
DYM/Henneo	4–10 Dec 2025	706	24.0	39.5	–	36.5	15.5
SocioMétrica/El Español	4–6 Dec 2025	1,100	32.4	46.8	–	20.8	14.4

=== Predicted President ===
The table below lists opinion polling on the perceived likelihood for each leader to become president.

Polling firm/Commissioner	Fieldwork date	Sample size			Other/ None/ Not care	Question	Lead
Polling firm/Commissioner	Fieldwork date	Sample size	Gallardo PSOE	Guardiola PP	Other/ None/ Not care	Question	Lead
SocioMétrica/El Español	4–6 Dec 2025	1,100	23.0	53.3	–	23.7	30.3

== Voter turnout ==
The table below shows registered voter turnout during the election. Figures for election day do not include non-resident citizens, while final figures do.

Province	Time (Election day)										Final		
Province	11:00	14:00			18:00			20:00			Final		
Province	2025	2023	2025	+/–	2023	2025	+/–	2023	2025	+/–	2023	2025	+/–
Badajoz	8.70%	41.94%	35.51%	−6.43	56.87%	49.95%	−6.92	72.14%	62.40%	−9.74	70.77%	61.12%	−9.65
Cáceres	9.03%	41.18%	36.16%	−5.02	57.54%	51.81%	−5.73	73.07%	63.29%	−9.78	69.68%	60.27%	−9.41
Total	8.83%	41.65%	35.76%	−5.89	57.12%	50.64%	−6.48	72.49%	62.73%	−9.76	70.35%	60.80%	−9.55

== Results ==
=== Overall ===
← Summary of the 21 December 2025 Assembly of Extremadura election results
Parties and alliances	Popular vote			Seats	
Parties and alliances	Votes	%	±pp	Total	+/−
People's Party (PP)	228,991	43.12	+4.34	29	+1
Spanish Socialist Workers' Party (PSOE)	136,838	25.77	−14.13	18	−10
Vox (Vox)	89,768	16.90	+8.77	11	+6
United for Extremadura We Can–United Left–Green Alliance (Podemos–IU–AV)	54,541	10.27	+4.26	7	+3
Together for Extremadura–Raise Extremadura (Juntos–Levanta)^{1}	4,181	0.79	−2.85	0	±0
New Extremennism–Forward Extremadura (NEx)	3,200	0.60	New	0	±0
Animalist Party with the Environment (PACMA)	2,302	0.43	New	0	±0
United Extremadura (EU)	1,548	0.29	New	0	±0
Citizens–Party of the Citizenry (Cs)	1,331	0.25	−0.64	0	±0
A Worthy Extremadura–Sovereignty and Work (UED–SyT)^{2}	1,221	0.23	−0.14	0	±0
For a Fairer World (M+J)	916	0.17	−0.01	0	±0
Blank ballots	6,229	1.17	−0.25		
Total	531,066			65	±0
Valid votes	531,066	98.03	+0.26		
Invalid votes	10,660	1.97	−0.26		
Votes cast / turnout	541,726	60.80	−9.55		
Abstentions	349,312	39.20	+9.55		
Registered voters	891,038				
Sources
Footnotes: ^{1} Together for Extremadura–Raise Extremadura results are compared to the combined totals of Together for Extremadura, Raise Extremadura and Cáceres Alive in the 2023 election.; ^{2} A Worthy Extremadura–Sovereignty and Work results are compared to A Worthy Extremadura totals in the 2023 election.

Popular vote
PP	43.12%
PSOE	25.77%
Vox	16.90%
UxE	10.27%
Others	2.77%
Blank ballots	1.17%

Seats
PP	44.62%
PSOE	27.69%
Vox	16.92%
UxE	10.77%

=== Distribution by constituency ===
Constituency	PP		PSOE		Vox		UxE	
Constituency	%	S	%	S	%	S	%	S
Badajoz	42.6	16	26.1	10	17.2	6	10.4	4
Cáceres	43.9	13	25.3	8	16.4	5	10.1	3
Total	43.1	29	25.8	18	16.9	11	10.3	7

== Aftermath ==
=== Government formation ===
Investiture; Nomination of María Guardiola (PP)
Ballot →	4 March 2026	6 March 2026
Required majority →	33 out of 65	Simple
Yes: • PP (29)	29 / 65	29 / 65
No: • PSOE (18); • Vox (11); • UxE (7)	36 / 65	36 / 65
Abstentions	0 / 65	0 / 65
Absentees	0 / 65	0 / 65

Investiture; Nomination of María Guardiola (PP)
Ballot →	22 April 2026
Required majority →	33 out of 65
Yes: • PP (29); • Vox (11)	40 / 65
No: • PSOE (18); • UxE (7)	25 / 65
Abstentions	0 / 65
Absentees	0 / 65

== Bibliography ==
- Ley Orgánica 5/1985, de 19 de junio, del Régimen Electoral General (Organic Law 5/1985). Official State Gazette (in Spanish). 19 June 1985 [version as of 14 July 2025]. BOE-A-1985-11672.
- Ley 2/1987, de 16 de marzo, de Elecciones a la Asamblea de Extremadura (Law 2/1987). Official State Gazette (in Spanish). 16 March 1987 [version as of 26 March 1991]. BOE-A-1987-8817.
- Ley 1/2002, de 28 de febrero, del Gobierno y de la Administración de la Comunidad Autónoma de Extremadura (Law 1/2002). Official State Gazette (in Spanish). 28 February 2002 [version as of 29 November 2022]. BOE-A-2002-7297.
- Ley Orgánica 1/2011, de 28 de enero, de reforma del Estatuto de Autonomía de la Comunidad Autónoma de Extremadura (Organic Law 1/2011). Official State Gazette (in Spanish). 28 January 2011 [version as of 29 January 2011]. BOE-A-2011-1638.
- Decreto de la Presidenta 8/2025, de 27 de octubre, de disolución de la Asamblea de Extremadura y de convocatoria de elecciones (PDF) (Decree 8/2025). Official Journal of Extremadura (in Spanish). 27 October 2025. 2025040248.
