= Irene de Miguel =

Spanish politician (born 1981)

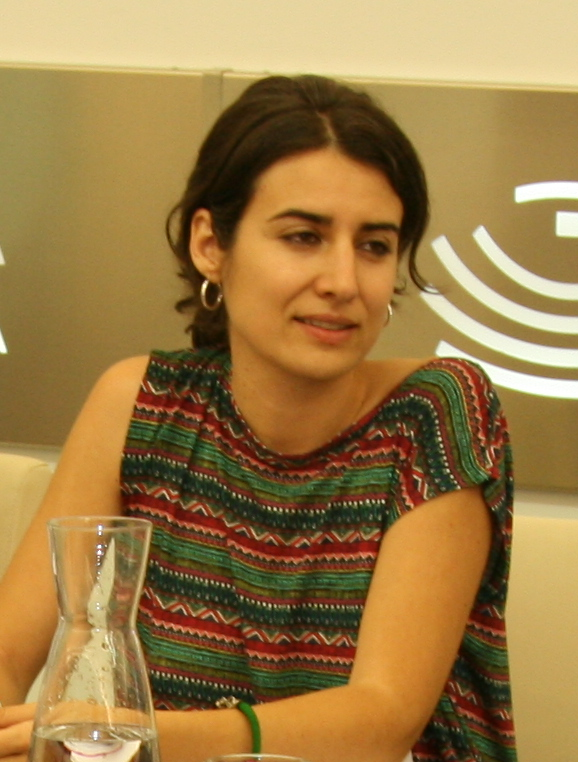
- Irene de Miguel in 2015

Member of the Assembly of Extremadura
- Incumbent
- Assumed office 23 June 2015
- Constituency: Badajoz

Leader of Unidas por Extremadura
- Incumbent
- Assumed office 9 March 2019

Personal details
- Born: 9 May 1981 (age 44) Madrid, Spain
- Party: Podemos
- Education: Polytechnic University of Madrid
- Occupation: Politician; Agricultural engineer

Irene de Miguel Pérez (born 9 May 1981) is a Spanish Podemos politician. She was elected to the Assembly of Extremadura in 2015, and has led Podemos Extremadura in the legislature since 2019.

== Biography ==
Born in Madrid, De Miguel qualified as an agricultural engineer at the Polytechnic University of Madrid. In 2011, she moved to the remote Las Villuercas comarca of the Province of Cáceres, Extremadura to cultivate specialist fruit trees. She was one of six Podemos members elected to the Assembly of Extremadura in 2015.

In November 2018, De Miguel received 93% of the votes to lead Podemos in the 2019 Extremaduran regional election. She ran in the Badajoz constituency this time, and her party dropped to four seats. In June 2020, she ran unopposed to succeed Álvaro Jaén as secretary general of Podemos in the region, and was elected with 94.98% of votes.

In the 2023 Extremaduran regional election, Podemos remained on four seats but dropped 8,000 votes. The party failed to win enough seats to be the junior partner in a Spanish Socialist Workers' Party (PSOE)-led coalition government, as the regional power went to the People's Party (PP) and Vox. She told regional newspaper Hoy that her party were unable to connect to voters. The party gained three seats in the 2025 snap election, while the PSOE lost ten and the PP had the most seats.
