= Cayetano Polo =

Spanish politician

Cayetano Polo Naharro (born 1973) is a Spanish former politician who was in the Citizens party. He was their leader for the 2019 Extremaduran regional election, where he won a seat in the Assembly of Extremadura.

== Biography ==
Born in Cáceres, Polo qualified in Forestry from the Polytechnic University of Madrid and possesses a Master of Business Administration from the EOI Business School. He was uninvolved in politics until 2014, when he joined Citizens due to his admiration of party leader Albert Rivera's liberal policies. The following year, he led the party in his hometown's city council elections, and was elected.

In early 2019, he was the only candidate to lead Citizens in May's Extremaduran elections, as the party's only regional legislator, Victoria Domínguez, declined to stand. They came third, with seven seats and 11.3% of votes.

Polo resigned from his party and his seat in September 2020, due to differences in opinion with the party's national leadership under Rivera's successor, Inés Arrimadas. In November, he was hired as Head of Institutional Relations for Infinity Lithium, an Australian corporation intending to mine for lithium near Cáceres.
