= President of the Regional Government of Extremadura =

- Presidente de la Junta de Extremadura
- Flag of Extremadura

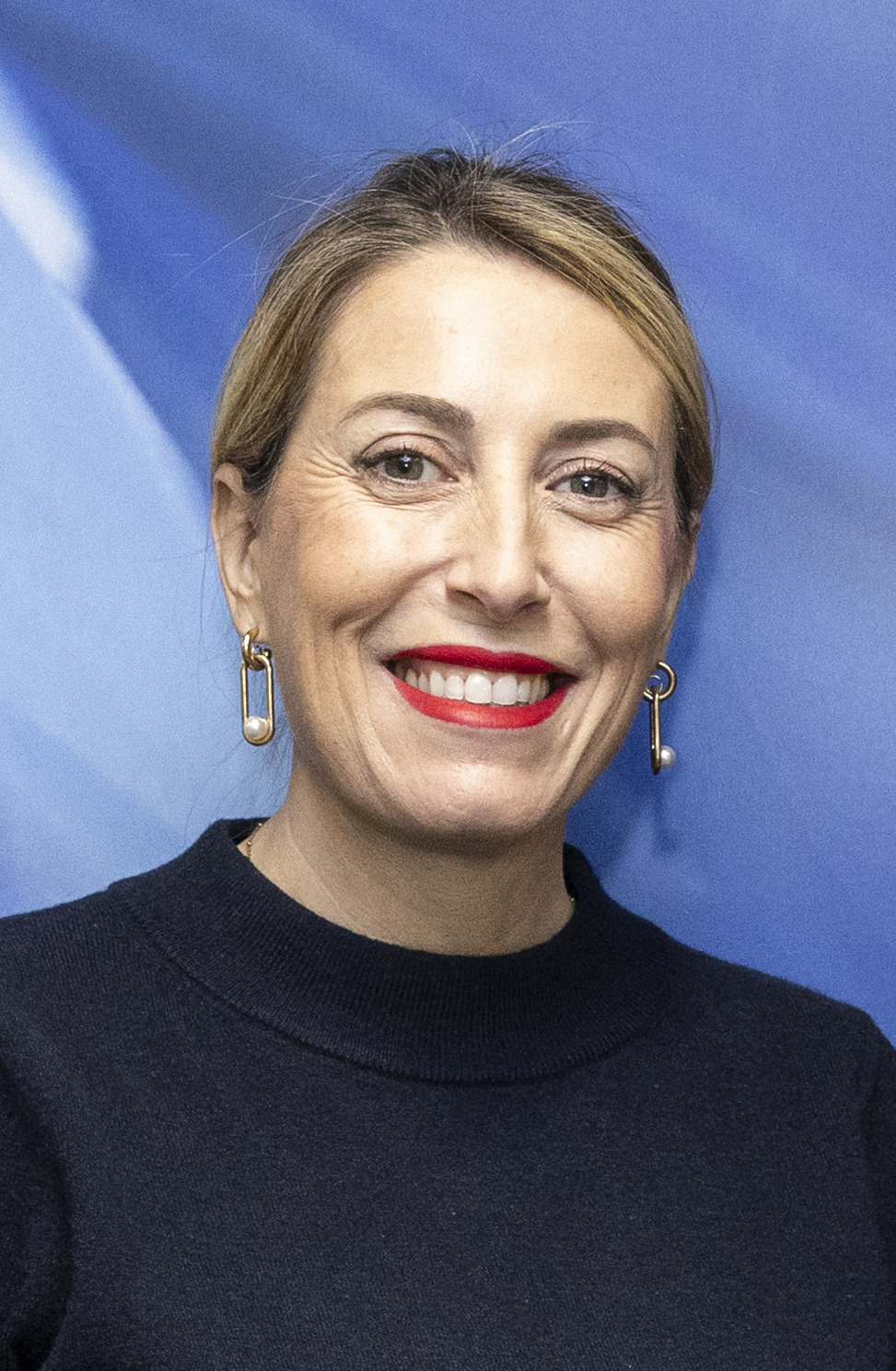
- Incumbent; María Guardiola since 2023
- Nominator: Assembly of Extremadura
- Appointer: The Monarch; countersigned by the Prime Minister
- Inaugural holder: Luis Ramallo
- Formation: 1978

The president of the Autonoumous Government of Extremadura (Spanish: Presidente de la Junta de Extremadura) is the head of government of the Spanish autonomous community of Extremadura.

María Guardiola from the PP is the current president of the Government of Extremadura; she was elected with the support of Vox.

== List of officeholders ==
Governments:

- PSOE
- PP
- Mixed coalition

Portrait	Name (Birth–Death)	Term of office			Party	Government Composition	Election	Monarch (Reign)	Ref.
Portrait	Name (Birth–Death)	Took office	Left office	Duration	Party	Government Composition	Election	Monarch (Reign)	Ref.
	Luis Ramallo (born 1938)	9 September 1978	9 December 1980	2 years and 91 days	UCD	Ramallo	N/A	King; Juan Carlos I (1975–2014)	
	Manuel Bermejo (1936–2009)	22 December 1980	27 November 1982	1 year and 340 days	UCD	Bermejo	N/A	King; Juan Carlos I (1975–2014)	
	Juan Carlos Rodríguez Ibarra (born 1948)	20 December 1982	10 June 1983	24 years and 191 days	PSOE	Ibarra I	N/A	King; Juan Carlos I (1975–2014)	
	Juan Carlos Rodríguez Ibarra (born 1948)	10 June 1983	21 July 1987	24 years and 191 days	PSOE	Ibarra II; PSOE	1983	King; Juan Carlos I (1975–2014)	
	Juan Carlos Rodríguez Ibarra (born 1948)	21 July 1987	4 July 1991	24 years and 191 days	PSOE	Ibarra III; PSOE	1987	King; Juan Carlos I (1975–2014)	
	Juan Carlos Rodríguez Ibarra (born 1948)	4 July 1991	17 July 1995	24 years and 191 days	PSOE	Ibarra IV; PSOE	1991	King; Juan Carlos I (1975–2014)	
	Juan Carlos Rodríguez Ibarra (born 1948)	17 July 1995	17 July 1999	24 years and 191 days	PSOE	Ibarra V PSOE	1995	King; Juan Carlos I (1975–2014)	
	Juan Carlos Rodríguez Ibarra (born 1948)	17 July 1999	24 June 2003	24 years and 191 days	PSOE	Ibarra VI; PSOE	1999	King; Juan Carlos I (1975–2014)	
	Juan Carlos Rodríguez Ibarra (born 1948)	24 June 2003	29 June 2007	24 years and 191 days	PSOE	Ibarra VII; PSOE	2003	King; Juan Carlos I (1975–2014)	
	Guillermo Fernández Vara (1958–2025)	29 June 2007	8 July 2011	4 years and 9 days	PSOE	Vara I PSOE	2007	King; Juan Carlos I (1975–2014)	
	José Antonio Monago (born 1966)	8 July 2011	3 July 2015	3 years and 360 days	PP	Monago; PP	2011	King; Juan Carlos I (1975–2014)	
	José Antonio Monago (born 1966)	8 July 2011	3 July 2015	3 years and 360 days	PP	Monago; PP	2011	King; Felipe VI (2014–present)	
	Guillermo Fernández Vara (1958–2025)	3 July 2015	27 June 2019	8 years and 12 days	PSOE	Vara II; PSOE	2015	King; Felipe VI (2014–present)	
	Guillermo Fernández Vara (1958–2025)	27 June 2019	15 July 2023	8 years and 12 days	PSOE	Vara III	2019	King; Felipe VI (2014–present)	
	María Guardiola (born 1978)	15 July 2023	23 April 2026	3 years and 102 days	PP	Guardiola I PP–Vox until Jul 2024; PP from Jul 2024	2023	King; Felipe VI (2014–present)	
	María Guardiola (born 1978)	23 April 2026	Incumbent	3 years and 102 days	PP	Guardiola II; PP–Vox	2025	King; Felipe VI (2014–present)	
