= 2019 Extremaduran regional election =

Election in the Spanish region of Extremadura

- 26 May 2019

All 65 seats in the Assembly of Extremadura 33 seats needed for a majority
- Opinion polls
- Registered: 899,930 ▼1.3%
- Turnout: 623,288 (69.3%) ▼2.1 pp
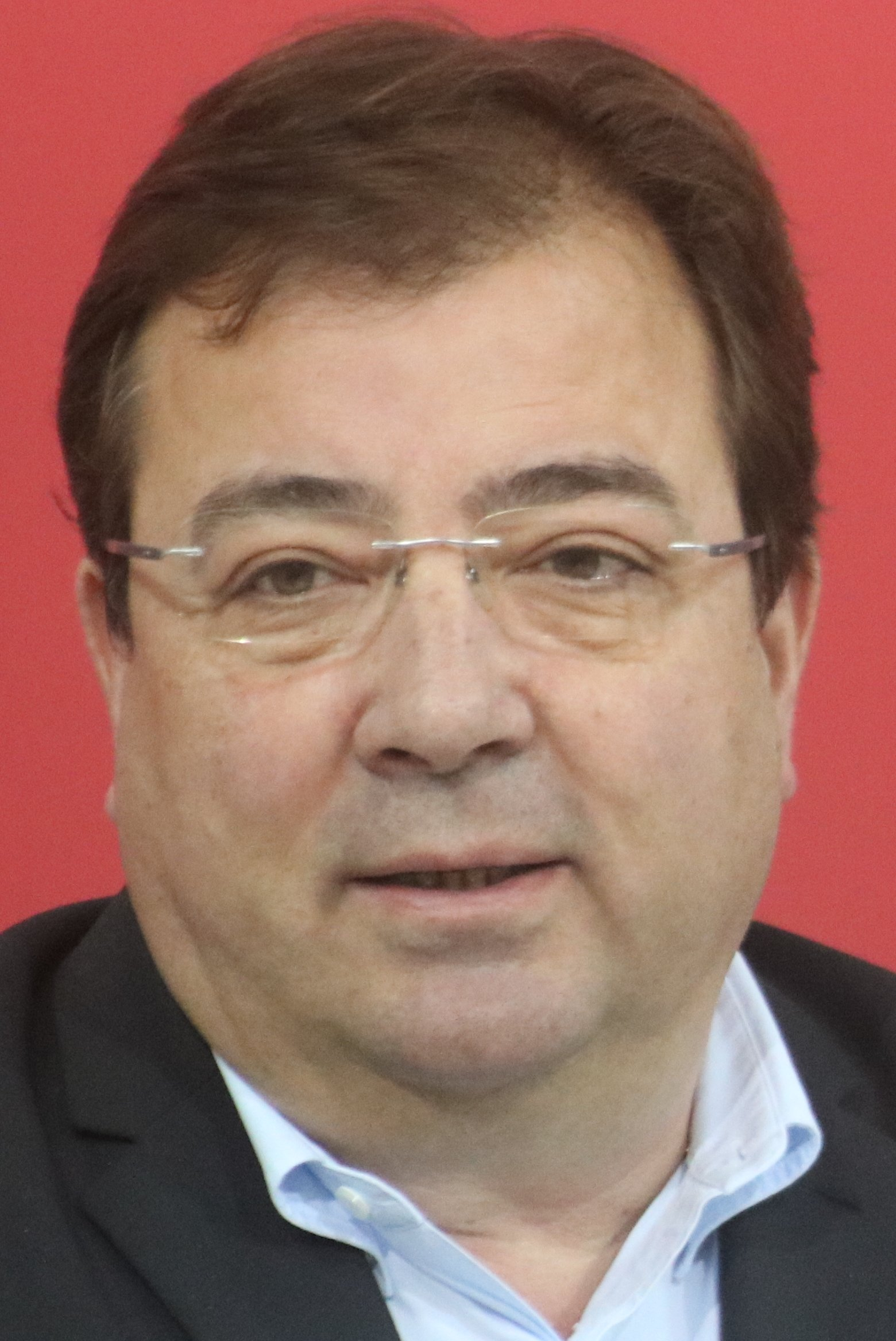

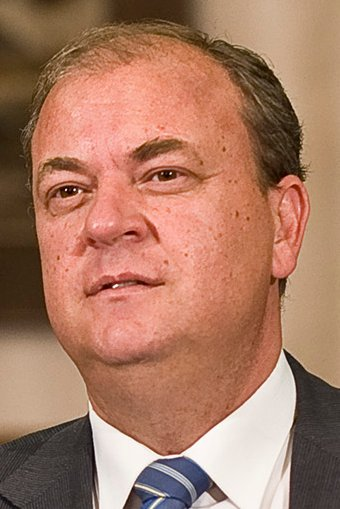

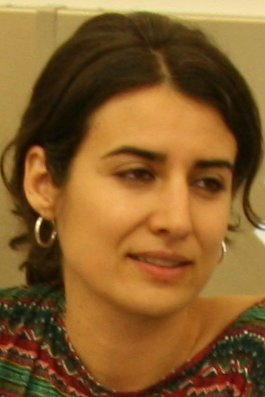
	First party	Second party	Third party
Leader	Guillermo Fernández Vara	José Antonio Monago	Cayetano Polo
Party	PSOE	PP	Cs
Leader since	20 September 2006	8 November 2008	19 February 2019
Leader's seat	Badajoz	Badajoz	Cáceres
Last election	30 seats, 41.5%	28 seats, 37.0%	1 seat, 4.4%
Seats won	34	20	7
Seat change	▲4	▼8	▲6
Popular vote	287,619	168,982	68,343
Percentage	46.8%	27.5%	11.1%
Swing	▲5.3 pp	▼9.5 pp	▲6.7 pp
	Fourth party
Leader	Irene de Miguel
Party	Podemos–IU–eX–Equo
Leader since	27 November 2018
Leader's seat	Cáceres
Last election	6 seats, 14.0% (Note: Results for Podemos (8.0%, 6 seats), Ganemos–IU–LV (4.2%, 0 seats), eX (1.5%, 0 seats) and AEx (0.2%, 0 seats) in the 2015 election.)
Seats won	4
Seat change	▼2
Popular vote	44,309
Percentage	7.2%
Swing	▼6.8 pp
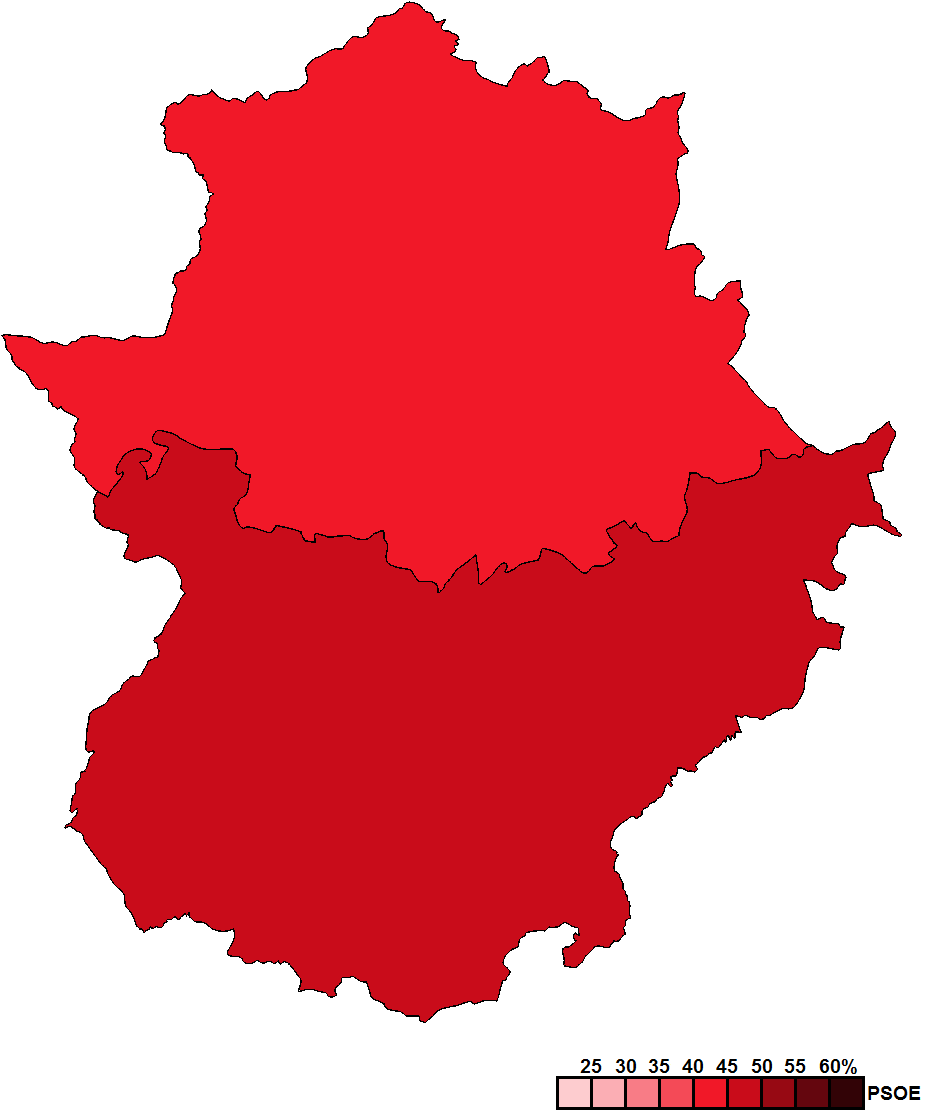
- Constituency results map for the Assembly of Extremadura
President before election
Guillermo Fernández Vara
PSOE
President after election
Guillermo Fernández Vara
PSOE

A regional election was held in Extremadura on 26 May 2019 to elect the 10th Assembly of the autonomous community. All 65 seats in the Assembly were up for election. It was held concurrently with regional elections in eleven other autonomous communities and local elections all across Spain, as well as the 2019 European Parliament election.

== Overview ==
Under the 2011 Statute of Autonomy, the Assembly of Extremadura was the unicameral legislature of the homonymous autonomous community, having legislative power in devolved matters, as well as the ability to grant or withdraw confidence from a regional president. The electoral and procedural rules were supplemented by national law provisions.

=== Date ===
The term of the Assembly of Extremadura expired four years after the date of its previous election, unless it was dissolved earlier. The election decree was required to be issued no later than 25 days before the scheduled expiration date of parliament and published on the following day in the Official Journal of Extremadura (DOE), with election day taking place 54 days after the decree's publication. The previous election was held on 24 May 2015, which meant that the chamber's term would have expired on 24 May 2019. The election decree was required to be published in the DOE no later than 30 April 2019, setting the latest possible date for election day on 23 June 2019.

The regional president had the prerogative to dissolve the Assembly of Extremadura at any given time and call a snap election, provided that no motion of no confidence was in process and that dissolution did not occur before one year after a previous one. In the event of an investiture process failing to elect a regional president within a two-month period from the first ballot, the Assembly was to be automatically dissolved and a fresh election called.

The election to the Assembly of Extremadura was officially called on 2 April 2019 with the publication of the corresponding decree in the DOE, setting election day for 26 May.

=== Electoral system ===
Voting for the Assembly was based on universal suffrage, comprising all Spanish nationals over 18 years of age, registered in Extremadura and with full political rights, provided that they had not been deprived of the right to vote by a final sentence. (Note: Amendments in 2018 granted the right to vote to those legally incapacitated.) Additionally, non-resident citizens were required to apply for voting, a system known as "begged" voting (Spanish: Voto rogado).

The Assembly of Extremadura had a maximum of 65 seats, with electoral provisions fixing its size at that number. All were elected in two multi-member constituencies—corresponding to the provinces of Badajoz and Cáceres, each of which was assigned an initial minimum of 20 seats and the remaining 25 distributed in proportion to population—using the D'Hondt method and closed-list proportional voting, with a five percent-threshold of valid votes (including blank ballots) in each constituency. Alternatively, parties could also enter the seat distribution as long as they ran candidates in both constituencies and reached five percent regionally.

As a result of the aforementioned allocation, each Assembly constituency was entitled the following seats:

Seats	Constituencies
36	Badajoz
29	Cáceres

The law did not provide for by-elections to fill vacant seats; instead, any vacancies arising after the proclamation of candidates and during the legislative term were filled by the next candidates on the party lists or, when required, by designated substitutes.

=== Outgoing parliament ===
The table below shows the composition of the parliamentary groups in the chamber at the time of the election call.

Parliamentary composition in April 2019
Groups	Parties	Legislators	
Groups	Parties	Seats	Total
Socialist Parliamentary Group	PSOE	30	30
People's Parliamentary Group	PP	27	27
We Can Extremadura Parliamentary Group	Podemos	6	6
Mixed Parliamentary Group	Cs	1	1
Non-Inscrits	Vox	1 (Note: Juan Antonio Morales, former PP legislator.)	1

== Parties and candidates ==
The electoral law allowed for parties and federations registered in the interior ministry, alliances and groupings of electors to present lists of candidates. Parties and federations intending to form an alliance were required to inform the relevant electoral commission within 10 days of the election call, whereas groupings of electors needed to secure the signature of at least two percent of the electorate in the constituencies for which they sought election, disallowing electors from signing for more than one list. Additionally, a balanced composition of men and women was required in the electoral lists, so that candidates of either sex made up at least 40 percent of the total composition.

Below is a list of the main parties and alliances which contested the election:

Candidacy	Parties and alliances	Candidate	Ideology	Previous result		Gov.	Ref.
Candidacy	Parties and alliances	Candidate	Ideology	Vote %	Seats	Gov.	Ref.
PSOE	List: Spanish Socialist Workers' Party (PSOE)	Guillermo Fernández Vara	Social democracy	41.5%	30	Yes	
PP	List: People's Party (PP)	José Antonio Monago	Conservatism; Christian democracy	37.0%	28	No	
Podemos– IU–eX–Equo	List: We Can (Podemos); United Left (IU) – Communist Party of Extremadura (PCEx) – The Dawn Marxist Organization (La Aurora (OM)) – Republican Left (IR) – Feminist Party of Spain (PFE); Extremadurans (eX) – Extremaduran Regionalist Party (PREx) – Regionalist Convergence of Extremadura (CREx); Equo (Equo)	Irene de Miguel	Left-wing populism Direct democracy Democratic socialism	14.0%	6	No	
Cs	List: Citizens–Party of the Citizenry (Cs)	Cayetano Polo	Liberalism	4.4%	1	No	
Vox	List: Vox (Vox)	Juan Antonio Morales	Right-wing populism Ultranationalism; National conservatism	0.3%	0	No	

== Campaign ==
=== Debates ===
2019 Extremaduran regional election debates
Date	Organizer(s)	Moderator(s)	P Present (Note: Denotes a main invitee attending the event.) S Surrogate (Note: Denotes a main invitee not attending the event, sending a surrogate in their place.) NI Not invited I Invited A Absent invitee								
Date	Organizer(s)	Moderator(s)	PSOE	PP	UxE	Cs	Vox	EU	PACT	Audience	Ref.
21 May	Canal Extremadura	Manu Pérez	P Vara	P Monago	P De Miguel	P Polo	P Morales	P Lanzas	P Marquéz	9.3% (33,000)	

== Opinion polls ==
The tables below list opinion polling results in reverse chronological order, showing the most recent first and using the dates when the survey fieldwork was done, as opposed to the date of publication. Where the fieldwork dates are unknown, the date of publication is given instead. The highest percentage figure in each polling survey is displayed with its background shaded in the leading party's colour. If a tie ensues, this is applied to the figures with the highest percentages. The "Lead" column on the right shows the percentage-point difference between the parties with the highest percentages in a poll.

=== Voting intention estimates ===
The table below lists weighted voting intention estimates. Refusals are generally excluded from the party vote percentages, while question wording and the treatment of "don't know" responses and those not intending to vote may vary between polling organisations. When available, seat projections determined by the polling organisations are displayed below (or in place of) the percentages in a smaller font; 33 seats were required for an absolute majority in the Assembly of Extremadura.

Color key:

Poll conducted after legal ban on opinion polls

Polling firm/Commissioner	Fieldwork date	Sample size	Turnout	PSOE	PP	Podemos	Cs	IU	eX	Vox	UxE	Lead
2019 regional election	26 May 2019	—N/a	69.3	46.8; 34	27.5; 20	(Note: Within UxE.)	11.1; 7			4.7; 0	7.2; 4	19.3
ElectoPanel/Electomanía	22–23 May 2019	?	?	40.6; 28	25.8; 18		15.8; 10			6.5; 4	8.6; 5	14.8
ElectoPanel/Electomanía	21–22 May 2019	?	?	40.7; 28	26.2; 18		15.6; 10			6.2; 4	8.4; 5	14.5
ElectoPanel/Electomanía	20–21 May 2019	?	?	40.5; 28	26.1; 18		15.6; 10			6.4; 4	8.5; 5	14.4
ElectoPanel/Electomanía	19–20 May 2019	?	?	40.4; 28	25.9; 18		15.8; 11			6.0; 3	8.4; 5	14.5
NC Report/La Razón	19 May 2019	?	?	42.9; 28	23.2; 16		? 10			? 5	? 6	19.3
ElectoPanel/Electomanía	16–19 May 2019	?	?	40.4; 28	24.9; 17		16.0; 11			6.5; 4	8.1; 5	15.5
ElectoPanel/Electomanía	13–16 May 2019	?	?	39.0; 27	23.3; 15		17.5; 12			8.1; 5	9.3; 6	15.7
ElectoPanel/Electomanía	10–13 May 2019	?	?	37.1; 25	23.0; 15		18.8; 13			9.2; 5	10.2; 7	14.1
ElectoPanel/Electomanía	7–10 May 2019	?	?	36.2; 25	22.2; 15		19.8; 13			8.6; 5	10.9; 7	14.0
Sigma Dos/Hoy	6–8 May 2019	1,100	?	40.2; 27/29	30.1; 20/22		13.8; 9			4.5; 2	8.3; 5	10.1
ElectoPanel/Electomanía	4–7 May 2019	?	?	37.0; 25	21.6; 15		19.8; 13			8.7; 5	10.8; 7	15.4
Ágora Integral/El Periódico	29 Apr–6 May 2019	1,200	?	44.1; 28/30	21.1; 14/16		13.1; 8/10			10.1; 5/7	10.1; 5/6	23.0
ElectoPanel/Electomanía	29 Apr–4 May 2019	?	?	37.0; 25	21.5; 15		19.7; 13			8.6; 5	10.9; 7	15.5
April 2019 general election	28 Apr 2019	—N/a	74.2	38.1 (26)	21.4 (14)		18.0 (12)		0.3 (0)	10.8 (7)	9.5 (6)	16.7
CIS	21 Mar–23 Apr 2019	531	?	45.6; 30/32	28.6; 19/21		9.3; 5/6			2.6; 0	12.3; 7/8	17.0
ElectoPanel/Electomanía	31 Mar–7 Apr 2019	?	?	37.4; 24	23.3; 15		11.9; 7			13.9; 11	10.0; 8	14.1
ElectoPanel/Electomanía	24–31 Mar 2019	?	?	37.4; 25	22.6; 15		12.3; 8			14.0; 11	9.8; 6	14.8
ElectoPanel/Electomanía	17–24 Mar 2019	?	?	38.6; 25	22.8; 15		11.9; 8			13.8; 11	9.4; 6	15.8
ElectoPanel/Electomanía	10–17 Mar 2019	?	?	37.0; 25	22.6; 15		11.2; 6			16.4; 13	9.3; 6	14.4
ElectoPanel/Electomanía	3–10 Mar 2019	?	?	36.4; 24	22.4; 14		11.8; 8			16.3; 13	9.5; 6	14.0
ElectoPanel/Electomanía	22 Feb–3 Mar 2019	?	?	36.2; 23	22.6; 15		11.9; 8			16.2; 13	9.5; 6	13.6
ElectoPanel/Electomanía	20–26 Jan 2019	578	?	34.2; 24	23.1; 16		17.2; 12		1.6; 0	9.4; 6	10.9; 7	11.1
Celeste-Tel/PSOE	14–25 Jan 2019	1,500	72.3	40.8; 30	28.9; 21	6.0; 4	13.8; 10	4.3; 0	–	4.8; 0	–	11.9
Sigma Dos/Hoy	14–18 May 2018	1,100	?	40.2; 28/30	32.8; 22/23	7.1; 4	14.7; 9/10	–	–	–	–	7.6
SyM Consulting	13–14 Mar 2018	1,430	73.2	42.3; 29/31	32.5; 23/24	6.0; 4	8.5; 5/6	4.7; 2	1.6; 0	–	–	9.8
Sigma Dos/Hoy	6–13 Mar 2017	1,200	?	40.1; 27/29	37.0; 26/27	8.8; 6	7.5; 4/5	1.6; 0	–	–	–	3.1
2016 general election	26 Jun 2016	—N/a	68.6	34.5 (23)	39.9 (27)		10.5 (7)		–	0.2 (0)	13.1 (8)	5.4
2015 general election	20 Dec 2015	—N/a	72.2	36.0 (26)	34.8 (24)	12.7 (8)	11.4 (7)	3.0 (0)	0.3 (0)	0.1 (0)	–	1.2
2015 regional election	24 May 2015	—N/a	71.4	41.5; 30	37.0; 28	8.0; 6	4.4; 1	4.2; 0	1.5; 0	0.3; 0	–	4.5

=== Voting preferences ===
The table below lists raw, unweighted voting preferences.

Polling firm/Commissioner	Fieldwork date	Sample size	PSOE	PP	Podemos	Cs	IU	eX	Vox	UxE	Question	X mark	Lead
2019 regional election (Note: Does not include non-resident citizens.)	26 May 2019	—N/a	32.9	19.4		7.8			3.3	5.1	—N/a	28.7	13.5
April 2019 general election	28 Apr 2019	—N/a	28.6	16.1		13.5		0.2	8.1	7.1	—N/a	23.7	12.5
CIS	21 Mar–23 Apr 2019	531	43.2	20.4		5.6			1.4	5.8	18.2	3.5	22.8
2016 general election	26 Jun 2016	—N/a	24.0	27.7		7.3		–	0.1	9.1	—N/a	29.6	3.7
2015 general election	20 Dec 2015	—N/a	26.3	25.5	9.2	8.3	2.2	0.2	0.1	–	—N/a	25.9	0.8
2015 regional election	24 May 2015	—N/a	29.9	26.7	5.8	3.1	3.1	1.0	0.2	–	—N/a	26.6	3.2

== Results ==
=== Overall ===
← Summary of the 26 May 2019 Assembly of Extremadura election results →
Parties and alliances	Popular vote			Seats	
Parties and alliances	Votes	%	±pp	Total	+/−
Spanish Socialist Workers' Party (PSOE)	287,619	46.77	+5.27	34	+4
People's Party (PP)	168,982	27.48	−9.52	20	−8
Citizens–Party of the Citizenry (Cs)	68,343	11.11	+6.72	7	+6
United for Extremadura (Podemos–IU–eXtremeños–Equo)^{1}	44,309	7.20	−6.76	4	−2
Vox (Vox)	28,992	4.71	+4.43	0	±0
United Extremadura (EU)	3,970	0.65	+0.16	0	±0
Animalist Party Against Mistreatment of Animals (PACMA)	3,460	0.56	+0.32	0	±0
Public Defense Organization (ODP)	1,422	0.23	New	0	±0
Act (PACT)	1,311	0.21	New	0	±0
For a Fairer World (PUM+J)	555	0.09	New	0	±0
With You, We Are Democracy (Contigo)	441	0.07	New	0	±0
Blank ballots	5,611	0.91	−0.43		
Total	615,015			65	±0
Valid votes	615,015	98.67	+0.53		
Invalid votes	8,273	1.33	−0.53		
Votes cast / turnout	623,288	69.26	−2.14		
Abstentions	276,642	30.74	+2.14		
Registered voters	899,930				
Sources
Footnotes: ^{1} United for Extremadura results are compared to the combined totals of We Can, Let's Win Extremadura–United Left–The Greens, Extremadurans and Forward Extremadura in the 2015 election.

Popular vote
PSOE	46.77%
PP	27.48%
Cs	11.11%
UxE	7.20%
Vox	4.71%
Others	1.87%
Blank ballots	0.91%

Seats
PSOE	52.31%
PP	30.77%
Cs	10.77%
UxE	6.15%

=== Distribution by constituency ===
Constituency	PSOE		PP		Cs		UxE	
Constituency	%	S	%	S	%	S	%	S
Badajoz	48.5	20	26.2	10	11.1	4	6.8	2
Cáceres	44.0	14	29.4	10	11.1	3	7.8	2
Total	46.8	34	27.5	20	11.1	7	7.2	4

== Aftermath ==
=== Government formation ===
Investiture; Nomination of Guillermo Fernández Vara (PSOE)
Ballot →	25 June 2019
Required majority →	33 out of 65
Yes: • PSOE (34)	34 / 65
No: • PP (20)	20 / 65
Abstentions: • Cs (7); • UxE (4)	11 / 65
Absentees	0 / 65

== Bibliography ==
- Ley Orgánica 5/1985, de 19 de junio, del Régimen Electoral General (Organic Law 5/1985). Official State Gazette (in Spanish). 19 June 1985 [version as of 6 March 2019]. BOE-A-1985-11672.
- Ley 2/1987, de 16 de marzo, de Elecciones a la Asamblea de Extremadura (Law 2/1987). Official State Gazette (in Spanish). 16 March 1987 [version as of 26 March 1991]. BOE-A-1987-8817.
- Ley 1/2002, de 28 de febrero, del Gobierno y de la Administración de la Comunidad Autónoma de Extremadura (Law 1/2002). Official State Gazette (in Spanish). 28 February 2002 [version as of 9 April 2019]. BOE-A-2002-7297.
- Ley Orgánica 1/2011, de 28 de enero, de reforma del Estatuto de Autonomía de la Comunidad Autónoma de Extremadura (Organic Law 1/2011). Official State Gazette (in Spanish). 28 January 2011 [version as of 29 January 2011]. BOE-A-2011-1638.
- Decreto del Presidente 1/2019, de 1 de abril, por el que se convocan elecciones a la Asamblea de Extremadura (PDF) (Decree 1/2019). Official Journal of Extremadura (in Spanish). 1 April 2019. 2019030006.
