= Unidas por Extremadura =

United for Extremadura Unidas por Extremadura
- Leader: Irene de Miguel
- Founded: 12 March 2019
- Ideology: Democratic socialism Progressivism; Environmentalism; Agrarianism; Regionalism
- Political position: Left-wing
- Colors: Purple
- Members: See list of members
- Assembly of Extremadura: 7 / 65

Website
- unidasporextremadura.org

Unidas por Extremadura (lit. 'United for Extremadura') is a left-wing electoral alliance in Extremadura formed by Podemos, United Left, Extremeños and Equo for the 2019, 2023 and 2025 Extremaduran regional election, reaching their biggest results ever in the last one.

== Composition ==
Party	Notes
We Can (Podemos)	
United Left (IU)	
Extremadurans (Extremeños)	Until 2023
Equo (Equo)	Until 2023
Green Alliance (AV)	Joined in 2023

== Electoral performance ==
=== Assembly of Extremadura ===
Assembly of Extremadura
Election	Leading candidate	Votes	%	Seats	Gov.
2019	Irene de Miguel	44,309	7.2 (#4)	4 / 65	No
2023	Irene de Miguel	36,836	6.0 (#4)	4 / 65	No
2025	Irene de Miguel	54,541	10.3 (#4)	7 / 65	No
