= 2023 Extremaduran regional election =

Election in the Spanish region of Extremadura

- 28 May 2023

All 65 seats in the Assembly of Extremadura 33 seats needed for a majority
- Opinion polls
- Registered: 889,836 ▼1.2%
- Turnout: 626,033 (70.4%) ▲1.1 pp
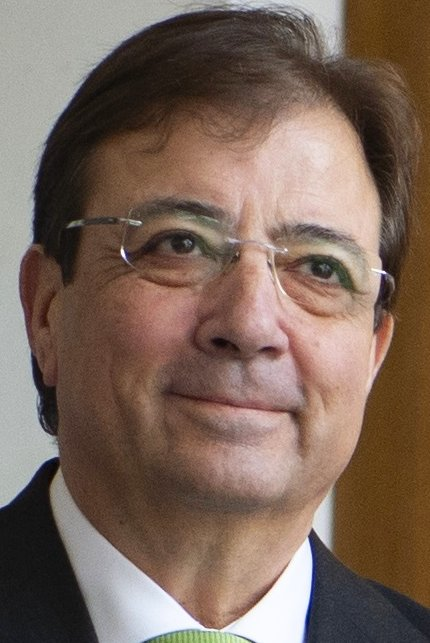

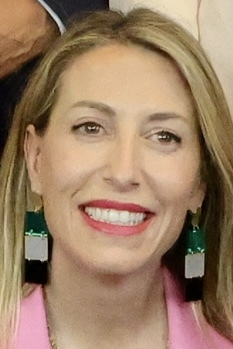

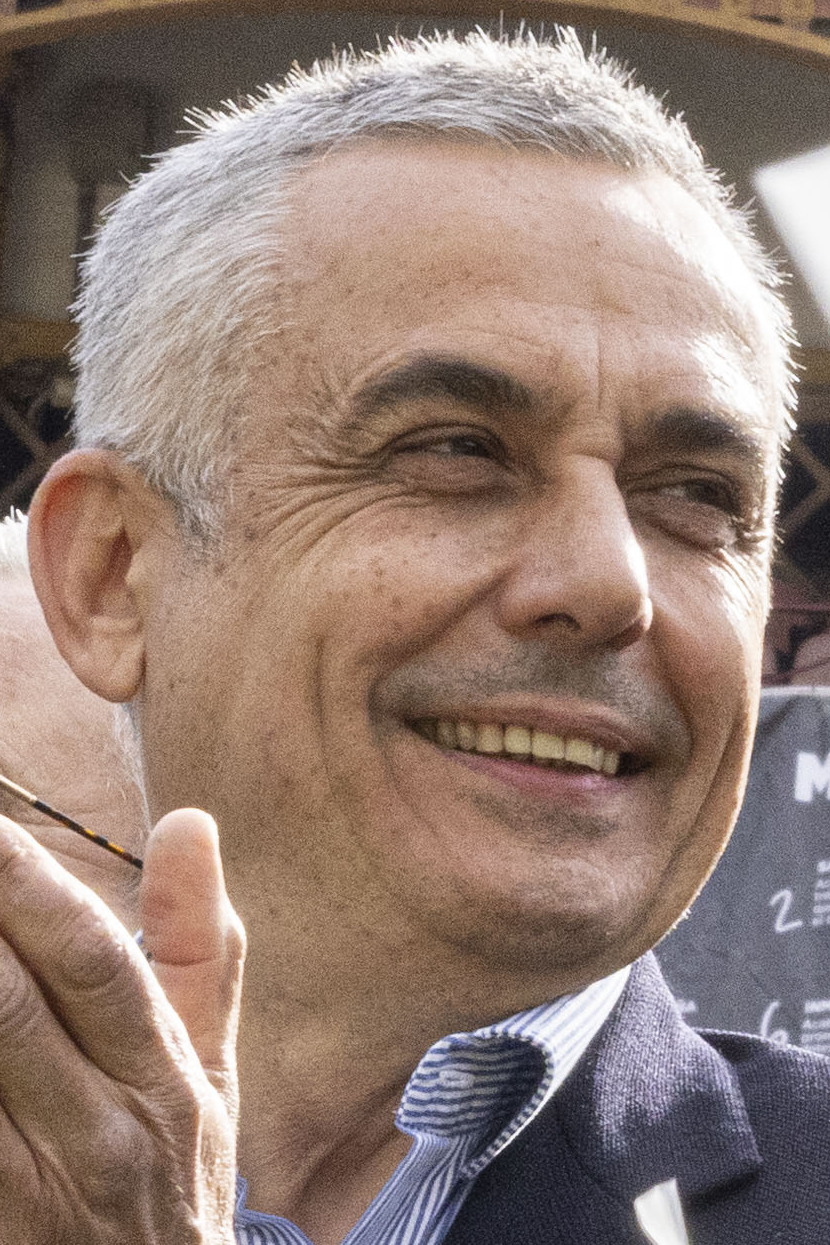

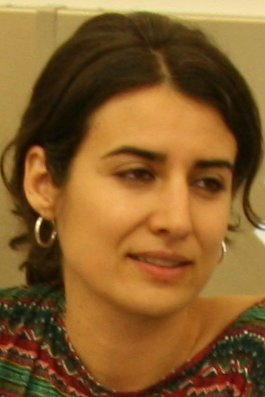

	First party	Second party	Third party
Leader	Guillermo Fernández Vara	María Guardiola	Ángel Pelayo Gordillo
Party	PSOE	PP	Vox
Leader since	20 September 2006	16 July 2022	1 February 2023
Leader's seat	Badajoz	Cáceres	Badajoz
Last election	34 seats, 46.8%	20 seats, 27.5%	0 seats, 4.7%
Seats won	28	28	5
Seat change	▼6	▲8	▲5
Popular vote	244,227	237,384	49,798
Percentage	39.9%	38.8%	8.1%
Swing	▼6.9 pp	▲11.3 pp	▲3.4 pp
	Fourth party	Fifth party
Leader	Irene de Miguel	Fernando Baselga
Party	Podemos–IU–AV	CS
Leader since	27 November 2018	6 February 2023
Leader's seat	Cáceres	Badajoz (lost)
Last election	4 seats, 7.2%	7 seats, 11.1%
Seats won	4	0
Seat change	0	▼7
Popular vote	36,836	5,463
Percentage	6.0%	0.9%
Swing	▼1.2 pp	▼10.2 pp
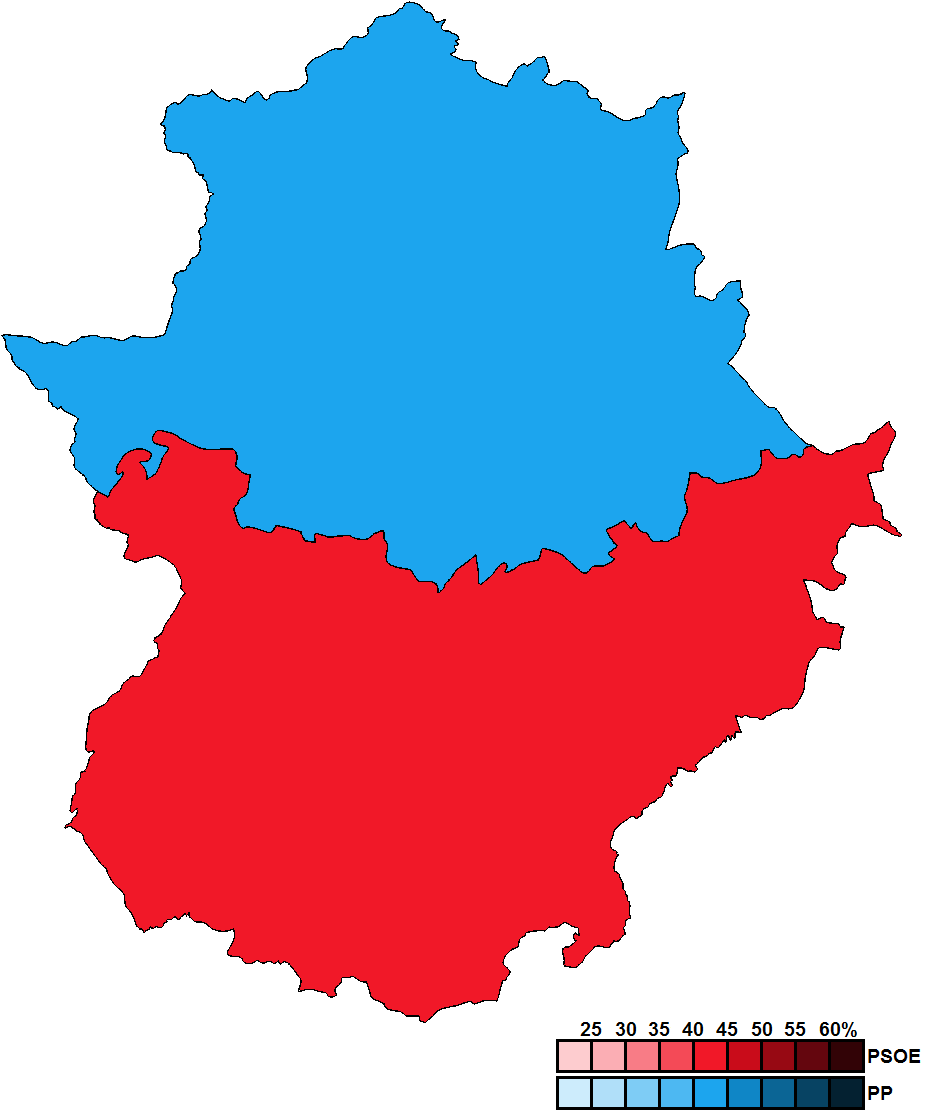
- Constituency results map for the Assembly of Extremadura
President before election
Guillermo Fernández Vara
PSOE
President after election
María Guardiola
PP

A regional election was held in Extremadura on 28 May 2023 to elect the 11th Assembly of the autonomous community. All 65 seats in the Assembly were up for election. It was held concurrently with regional elections in eleven other autonomous communities and local elections all across Spain.

The Spanish Socialist Workers' Party (PSOE), which had ruled Extremadura since 2015—and previously from 1982 to 2011—lost its absolute majority, tying with the opposition People's Party (PP) under María Guardiola with 28 seats each. The entry of the far-right Vox party with 5 seats, coupled with the left-wing United for Extremadura (UxE) alliance remaining stagnant at 4 seats, meant that the right-wing parties commanded a majority in the Assembly, which initially prompted President Guillermo Fernández Vara to concede on election night. However, following Guardiola's initial rejection to form a coalition government with Vox, Vara reneged on his renounce and pledged to attempt to form a government of his own by virtue of leading the most-voted party.

Following several weeks of public fighting—which led to PSOE and UxE retaining control of the Assembly's bureau and saw Guardiola herself proclaim that she could not allow into her government "those who deny gender-based violence, who use bold strokes, dehumanize immigrants and display a banner on which they throw the LGTBI flag into a trash can", in reference to Vox—Guardiola U-turned and accepted to include Vox in her cabinet in exchange for the latter to elect her as new regional president, thus forming the second PP-led government in the history of the region. This political episode was said as having had an impact in the outcome of the 2023 Spanish general election held on 23 July, as it evidenced the PP's willingness to allow the far-right into government despite initial pledges to the contrary.

== Overview ==
Under the 2011 Statute of Autonomy, the Assembly of Extremadura was the unicameral legislature of the homonymous autonomous community, having legislative power in devolved matters, as well as the ability to grant or withdraw confidence from a regional president. The electoral and procedural rules were supplemented by national law provisions.

=== Date ===
The term of the Assembly of Extremadura expired four years after the date of its previous election, unless it was dissolved earlier. The election decree was required to be issued no later than 25 days before the scheduled expiration date of parliament and published on the following day in the Official Journal of Extremadura (DOE), with election day taking place 54 days after the decree's publication. The previous election was held on 26 May 2019, which meant that the chamber's term would have expired on 26 May 2023. The election decree was required to be published in the DOE no later than 2 May 2023, setting the latest possible date for election day on 25 June 2023.

The regional president had the prerogative to dissolve the Assembly of Extremadura at any given time and call a snap election, provided that no motion of no confidence was in process and that dissolution did not occur before one year after a previous one. In the event of an investiture process failing to elect a regional president within a two-month period from the first ballot, the Assembly was to be automatically dissolved and a fresh election called.

The election to the Assembly of Extremadura was officially called on 4 April 2023 with the publication of the corresponding decree in the DOE, setting election day for 28 May.

=== Electoral system ===
Voting for the Assembly was based on universal suffrage, comprising all Spanish nationals over 18 years of age, registered in Extremadura and with full political rights, provided that they had not been deprived of the right to vote by a final sentence. Amendments in 2022 abolished the "begged" voting system (Spanish: Voto rogado), under which non-resident citizens were required to apply for voting. The begged vote system was attributed responsibility for a major decrease in the turnout of Spaniards abroad during the years it was in force.

The Assembly of Extremadura had a maximum of 65 seats, with electoral provisions fixing its size at that number. All were elected in two multi-member constituencies—corresponding to the provinces of Badajoz and Cáceres, each of which was assigned an initial minimum of 20 seats and the remaining 25 distributed in proportion to population—using the D'Hondt method and closed-list proportional voting, with a five percent-threshold of valid votes (including blank ballots) in each constituency. Alternatively, parties could also enter the seat distribution as long as they ran candidates in both constituencies and reached five percent regionally.

As a result of the aforementioned allocation, each Assembly constituency was entitled the following seats:

Seats	Constituencies
36	Badajoz
29	Cáceres

The law did not provide for by-elections to fill vacant seats; instead, any vacancies arising after the proclamation of candidates and during the legislative term were filled by the next candidates on the party lists or, when required, by designated substitutes.

=== Outgoing parliament ===
The table below shows the composition of the parliamentary groups in the chamber at the time of the election call.

Parliamentary composition in April 2023
Groups	Parties	Legislators	
Groups	Parties	Seats	Total
Socialist Parliamentary Group	PSOE	34	34
People's Parliamentary Group	PP	20	20
Citizens–Party of the Citizenry; Parliamentary Group	CS	7	7
United for Extremadura; Parliamentary Group	Podemos	2	4
United for Extremadura; Parliamentary Group	IU	1	4
United for Extremadura; Parliamentary Group	eX	1	4

== Parties and candidates ==
The electoral law allowed for parties and federations registered in the interior ministry, alliances and groupings of electors to present lists of candidates. Parties and federations intending to form an alliance were required to inform the relevant electoral commission within 10 days of the election call, whereas groupings of electors needed to secure the signature of at least two percent of the electorate in the constituencies for which they sought election, disallowing electors from signing for more than one list. Additionally, a balanced composition of men and women was required in the electoral lists, so that candidates of either sex made up at least 40 percent of the total composition.

Below is a list of the main parties and alliances which contested the election:

Candidacy	Parties and alliances	Candidate	Ideology	Previous result		Gov.	Ref.
Candidacy	Parties and alliances	Candidate	Ideology	Vote %	Seats	Gov.	Ref.
PSOE	List: Spanish Socialist Workers' Party (PSOE)	Guillermo Fernández Vara	Social democracy	46.8%	34	Yes	
PP	List: People's Party (PP)	María Guardiola	Conservatism; Christian democracy	27.5%	20	No	
CS	List: Citizens–Party of the Citizenry (CS)	Fernando Baselga	Liberalism	11.1%	7	No	
Podemos– IU–AV	List: We Can (Podemos); United Left (IU) – Communist Party of Extremadura (PCEx) – The Dawn Marxist Organization (La Aurora (OM)) – Republican Left (IR); Green Alliance (AV)	Irene de Miguel	Left-wing populism Direct democracy Democratic socialism	7.2%	4	No	
Vox	List: Vox (Vox)	Ángel Pelayo Gordillo	Right-wing populism Ultranationalism; National conservatism	4.7%	0	No	

== Campaign ==
=== Debates ===
The only campaign debate was held on May 17 and had the participation of candidates from ten parties, an unusually high number. The PSOE candidate, and current president, Guillermo Fernández Vara, would have refused to participate in a debate that had not include all parties. The People's Party accused him of wanting to "hide" in such a large crowd. The chosen date was also criticized for coinciding with the semifinal of the UEFA Champions League, in which Real Madrid participated, which could reduce the audience for the debate.

2023 Extremaduran regional election debates
Date	Organizer(s)	Moderator(s)	P Present (Note: Denotes a main invitee attending the event.) S Surrogate (Note: Denotes a main invitee not attending the event, sending a surrogate in their place.) NI Not invited I Invited A Absent invitee											
Date	Organizer(s)	Moderator(s)	PSOE	PP	CS	UxE	Vox	L	PUM+J	JUEx	PEx	UED	Audience	Ref.
17 May	Canal Extremadura	Manu Pérez	P Vara	P Guardiola	P Baselga	P De Miguel	P Gordillo	P Martín	P Blanco	P Granero	P González	P Caro	8.6% (23,000)	

== Opinion polls ==
The tables below list opinion polling results in reverse chronological order, showing the most recent first and using the dates when the survey fieldwork was done, as opposed to the date of publication. Where the fieldwork dates are unknown, the date of publication is given instead. The highest percentage figure in each polling survey is displayed with its background shaded in the leading party's colour. If a tie ensues, this is applied to the figures with the highest percentages. The "Lead" column on the right shows the percentage-point difference between the parties with the highest percentages in a poll.

=== Graphical summary ===
Local regression trend line of poll results from 26 May 2019 to 28 May 2023, with each line corresponding to a political party.

=== Voting intention estimates ===
The table below lists weighted voting intention estimates. Refusals are generally excluded from the party vote percentages, while question wording and the treatment of "don't know" responses and those not intending to vote may vary between polling organisations. When available, seat projections determined by the polling organisations are displayed below (or in place of) the percentages in a smaller font; 33 seats were required for an absolute majority in the Assembly of Extremadura.

Polling firm/Commissioner	Fieldwork date	Sample size	Turnout	PSOE	PP	CS	UxE	Vox	Más País	JUEx	L	Lead
2023 regional election	28 May 2023	—N/a	70.4	39.9; 28	38.8; 28	0.9; 0	6.0; 4	8.1; 5	–	2.5; 0	0.8; 0	1.1
NC Report/La Razón	22 May 2023	?	?	43.2; 30/31	35.7; 26/27	–	6.1; 4	7.1; 4	–	4.4; 0/1	–	7.5
KeyData/Público	17 May 2023	?	71.2	41.8; 30	36.3; 26	1.6; 0	6.7; 4	8.5; 5	–	–	–	5.5
EM-Analytics/El Plural	11–17 May 2023	600	?	43.3; 31	35.7; 25	1.8; 0	6.8; 4	9.4; 5	–	2.2; 0	–	7.6
Data10/Okdiario	12–15 May 2023	1,500	?	42.2; 29	37.8; 27	1.7; 0	6.3; 4	8.8; 5	–	–	–	4.4
SocioMétrica/El Español	8–14 May 2023	?	?	41.8; 29/30	37.2; 26/27	2.3; 0	6.4; 3/4	8.8; 5/6	–	–	–	4.6
EM-Analytics/El Plural	4–10 May 2023	600	?	43.0; 31	35.9; 25	1.8; 0	6.8; 4	9.4; 5	–	2.2; 0	–	7.1
GAD3/ABC	28 Apr–3 May 2023	1,004	?	40.3; 29/30	37.4; 27/28	1.6; 0	6.8; 3/4	8.6; 4/5	–	–	–	2.9
EM-Analytics/El Plural	26 Apr–3 May 2023	600	?	42.8; 31	36.0; 25	1.8; 0	6.9; 4	9.4; 5	–	2.2; 0	–	6.8
Ágora Integral/El Periódico	27 Apr–2 May 2023	1,200	?	42.8; 29/31	36.5; 25/27	0.5; 0	6.2; 4	7.3; 5	–	4.8; 0/1	–	6.3
CIS	10–26 Apr 2023	743	?	40.6; 28/29	35.9; 24/26	1.5; 0	10.3; 4/8	8.6; 5/6	–	–	–	4.7
EM-Analytics/El Plural	19–25 Apr 2023	600	?	42.8; 30	35.7; 25	1.9; 0	6.7; 4	9.4; 6	–	2.4; 0	–	7.1
Simple Lógica/elDiario.es	12–19 Apr 2023	600	?	39.4; 28/29	34.2; 24/25	2.5; 0	7.4; 5/6	9.0; 6/7	–	3.3; 0	2.2; 0/1	5.2
EM-Analytics/El Plural	12–18 Apr 2023	600	?	42.9; 30	35.3; 25	2.1; 0	6.4; 4	9.8; 6	–	2.4; 0	–	7.6
Data10/Okdiario	11–14 Apr 2023	1,500	?	42.8; 30	37.5; 26	2.1; 0	5.9; 4	8.1; 5	–	–	–	5.3
IMOP/El Confidencial	10–13 Apr 2023	822	70	42.4; 30	33.6; 24	2.5; 0	6.8; 4	10.5; 7	–	–	–	8.8
EM-Analytics/El Plural	5–11 Apr 2023	600	?	43.8; 31	33.8; 23	1.9; 0	5.9; 4	10.9; 7	–	2.6; 0	–	10.0
Celeste-Tel/PSOE	27 Mar–11 Apr 2023	1,500	?	? 31	? 26	? 0	? 4	? 4	–	–	–	?
SocioMétrica/El Español	3–7 Apr 2023	1,200	?	41.2; 29/30	37.7; 26/27	2.0; 0	6.6; 3	8.9; 6	–	–	–	3.5
EM-Analytics/El Plural	27 Mar–4 Apr 2023	600	?	43.7; 31	33.8; 23	1.8; 0	5.8; 4	10.7; 7	–	2.9; 0	–	9.9
NC Report/La Razón	10–17 Mar 2023	?	71.0	43.5; 30	37.3; 27	–	6.6; 4	6.9; 4	–	–	–	6.2
KeyData/Público	15 Mar 2023	?	73.0	42.2; 30	35.9; 26	2.8; 0	6.5; 4	7.2; 5	–	–	–	6.3
Data10/Okdiario	13–15 Feb 2023	1,500	?	42.4; 29	37.7; 27	2.2; 0	6.1; 4	7.8; 5	–	–	–	4.7
Sigma Dos/El Mundo	30 Nov–5 Dec 2022	900	?	41.2; 29/30	35.4; 26/27	4.5; 0/1	7.6; 4/5	6.9; 4	–	–	–	5.8
CIS (Note: Vote+Simpathy figures with undecided and/or abstentionists excluded.)	17 Nov–2 Dec 2022	242	?	36.9; 24/32	41.4; 26/35	1.0; 0/2	7.3; 0/6	4.4; 0/5	–	–	–	4.5
EM-Analytics/Electomanía	1 Oct–13 Nov 2022	303	?	43.3; 30	31.5; 23	1.5; 0	5.4; 3	13.5; 9	–	3.6; 0	–	11.8
GAD3/PP	26–31 Oct 2022	802	?	41.9; 29/30	37.5; 27/28	2.5; 0	5.5; 3/4	6.7; 4/5	–	–	–	4.4
Celeste-Tel/PSOE	21 Sep–10 Oct 2022	1,800	72.6	45.2; 31/33	33.5; 23/25	4.3; 0	6.6; 4	7.8; 5	0.9; 0	–	–	11.7
EM-Analytics/Electomanía	30 Mar 2021	400	?	45.4; 32	31.9; 23	3.5; 0	5.5; 3	11.4; 7	–	–	–	13.5
SyM Consulting	12–14 Mar 2021	1,437	71.3	51.4; 37/38	28.4; 20/21	2.7; 0	4.9; 1	9.2; 5/7	–	–	–	23.0
ElectoPanel/Electomanía	1 Apr–15 May 2020	?	?	46.8; 33	31.6; 22	6.1; 3	7.3; 4	5.4; 3	–	–	–	15.2
SyM Consulting	7–9 May 2020	1,496	71.8	44.9; 32	28.2; 17/18	7.8; 4/5	7.0; 5/6	9.5; 5/6	–	–	–	16.7
November 2019 general election	10 Nov 2019	—N/a	67.2	38.3; 27	26.0; 17	7.6; 5	9.1; 5	16.8; 11	–	–	–	12.3
2019 regional election	26 May 2019	—N/a	69.3	46.8; 34	27.5; 20	11.1; 7	7.2; 4	4.7; 0	–	–	–	19.3

=== Voting preferences ===
The table below lists raw, unweighted voting preferences.

Polling firm/Commissioner	Fieldwork date	Sample size	PSOE	PP	CS	UxE	Vox	Question	X mark	Lead
2023 regional election (Note: Does not include non-resident citizens.)	28 May 2023	—N/a	28.2	27.5	0.6	4.2	5.7	—N/a	27.5	0.7
CIS	10–26 Apr 2023	743	29.1	24.7	0.7	6.7	5.8	27.0	3.0	4.4
CIS	17 Nov–2 Dec 2022	242	20.9	26.7	0.4	4.4	2.6	29.4	6.9	5.8
November 2019 general election	10 Nov 2019	—N/a	26.0	17.7	5.1	6.2	11.4	—N/a	30.9	8.3
2019 regional election	26 May 2019	—N/a	32.9	19.4	7.8	5.1	3.3	—N/a	28.7	13.5

=== Predicted President ===
The table below lists opinion polling on the perceived likelihood for each leader to become president of the Regional Government of Extremadura.

Polling firm/Commissioner	Fieldwork date	Sample size						Other/ None/ Not care	Question	Lead
Polling firm/Commissioner	Fieldwork date	Sample size	Vara PSOE	Guardiola PP	Baselga CS	De Miguel UxE	Gordillo Vox	Other/ None/ Not care	Question	Lead
SocioMétrica/El Español	3–7 Apr 2023	1,200	54.6	26.5	6.2	7.1	5.6	–	–	28.1

== Results ==
=== Overall ===
← Summary of the 28 May 2023 Assembly of Extremadura election results →
Parties and alliances	Popular vote			Seats	
Parties and alliances	Votes	%	±pp	Total	+/−
Spanish Socialist Workers' Party (PSOE)	244,227	39.90	−6.87	28	−6
People's Party (PP)	237,384	38.78	+11.30	28	+8
Vox (Vox)	49,798	8.13	+3.42	5	+5
United for Extremadura We Can–United Left–Green Alliance (Podemos–IU–AV)	36,836	6.01	−1.19	4	±0
Together for Extremadura (JUEx)	15,559	2.54	New	0	±0
Citizens–Party of the Citizenry (CS)	5,463	0.89	−10.22	0	−7
Raise Extremadura (Levanta)^{1}	4,679	0.76	+0.11	0	±0
A Worthy Extremadura (UED)	2,289	0.37	New	0	±0
Cáceres Alive (Cáceres Viva)	2,117	0.34	New	0	±0
We Are Cáceres (Somos Cc)	1,975	0.32	New	0	±0
Extremennist Party–Extremennists–Party of Extremadurans (PEx–EXT)	1,892	0.30	New	0	±0
For a Fairer World (PUM+J)	1,156	0.18	+0.09	0	±0
Blank ballots	8,721	1.42	+0.51		
Total	612,096			65	±0
Valid votes	612,096	97.77	−0.90		
Invalid votes	13,937	2.23	+0.90		
Votes cast / turnout	626,033	70.35	+1.09		
Abstentions	263,803	29.65	−1.09		
Registered voters	889,836				
Sources
Footnotes: ^{1} Raise Extremadura results are compared to United Extremadura totals in the 2019 election.

Popular vote
PSOE	39.90%
PP	38.78%
Vox	8.13%
UxE	6.01%
JUEx	2.54%
Others	3.22%
Blank ballots	1.42%

Seats
PSOE	43.08%
PP	43.08%
Vox	7.69%
UxE	6.15%

=== Distribution by constituency ===
Constituency	PSOE		PP		Vox		UxE	
Constituency	%	S	%	S	%	S	%	S
Badajoz	41.2	16	38.0	15	8.0	3	6.0	2
Cáceres	37.7	12	40.1	13	8.4	2	6.1	2
Total	39.9	28	38.8	28	8.1	5	6.0	4

== Aftermath ==
=== Government formation ===
Investiture; Nomination of María Guardiola (PP)
Ballot →	14 July 2023
Required majority →	33 out of 65
Yes: • PP (28); • Vox (5)	33 / 65
No: • PSOE (28); • UxE (4)	32 / 65
Abstentions	0 / 65
Absentees	0 / 65

== Bibliography ==
- Ley Orgánica 5/1985, de 19 de junio, del Régimen Electoral General (Organic Law 5/1985). Official State Gazette (in Spanish). 19 June 1985 [version as of 3 October 2022]. BOE-A-1985-11672.
- Ley 2/1987, de 16 de marzo, de Elecciones a la Asamblea de Extremadura (Law 2/1987). Official State Gazette (in Spanish). 16 March 1987 [version as of 26 March 1991]. BOE-A-1987-8817.
- Ley 1/2002, de 28 de febrero, del Gobierno y de la Administración de la Comunidad Autónoma de Extremadura (Law 1/2002). Official State Gazette (in Spanish). 28 February 2002 [version as of 29 November 2022]. BOE-A-2002-7297.
- Ley Orgánica 1/2011, de 28 de enero, de reforma del Estatuto de Autonomía de la Comunidad Autónoma de Extremadura (Organic Law 1/2011). Official State Gazette (in Spanish). 28 January 2011 [version as of 29 January 2011]. BOE-A-2011-1638.
- Decreto del Presidente 1/2023, de 3 de abril, por el que se convocan elecciones a la Asamblea de Extremadura (PDF) (Decree 1/2023). Official Journal of Extremadura (in Spanish). 3 April 2023. 2023030001.
