= Spanish Socialist Workers' Party of Extremadura =

Spanish Socialist Workers' Party of Extremadura Partido Socialista Obrero Español de Extremadura
- President: Marisol Mateos Nogales
- Secretary-General: Álvaro Sánchez Cotrina
- Founded: 1988
- Headquarters: Avda. Eugenio de Montermoso, 21-23; 06800 Mérida, Extremadura
- Membership (2014): 9,458
- Ideology: Social democracy
- Political position: Centre-left
- National affiliation: Spanish Socialist Workers' Party
- Congress of Deputies: 5 / 10 (Extremaduran seats)
- Spanish Senate: 7 / 10 (Extremaduran seats)
- Assembly of Extremadura: 18 / 65
- Provincial deputations: 30 / 52
- Local seats: 1,637 / 3,350

Website
- www.psoeextremadura.com

The Spanish Socialist Workers' Party of Extremadura (Spanish: Partido Socialista Obrero Español de Extremadura, PSOE–E) is the regional branch in Extremadura of the Spanish Socialist Workers' Party (PSOE), main centre-left party in Spain since the 1970s.

== Electoral performance ==
=== Assembly of Extremadura ===
Assembly of Extremadura
Election	Leading candidate	Votes	%	Seats	Gov.
1983	Juan Carlos Rodríguez Ibarra	296,939	53.0 (#1)	35 / 65	Yes
1987	Juan Carlos Rodríguez Ibarra	292,935	49.2 (#1)	34 / 65	Yes
1991	Juan Carlos Rodríguez Ibarra	314,384	54.2 (#1)	39 / 65	Yes
1995	Juan Carlos Rodríguez Ibarra	289,149	43.9 (#1)	31 / 65	Yes
1999	Juan Carlos Rodríguez Ibarra	313,417	48.5 (#1)	34 / 65	Yes
2003 (Note: Electoral alliance with PREx–CREx.)	Juan Carlos Rodríguez Ibarra	341,522	51.7 (#1)	36 / 65	Yes
2007	Guillermo Fernández Vara	352,342	53.0 (#1)	38 / 65	Yes
2011	Guillermo Fernández Vara	290,045	43.4 (#2)	30 / 65	No
2015 (Note: Electoral alliance with SIEx.)	Guillermo Fernández Vara	265,015	41.5 (#1)	30 / 65	Yes
2019	Guillermo Fernández Vara	287,619	46.8 (#1)	34 / 65	Yes
2023	Guillermo Fernández Vara	244,227	39.9 (#1)	28 / 65	No
2025	Miguel Ángel Gallardo	136,838	25.8 (#2)	18 / 65	No

=== Cortes Generales ===
Cortes Generales
Election	Extremadura						
Election	Congress					Senate	
Election	Votes	%	#	Seats	+/–	Seats	+/–
1977	162,624	30.78%	2nd	4 / 12	—	2 / 8	—
1979	201,350	37.57%	2nd	5 / 12	1	2 / 8	0
1982	333,046	55.41%	1st	9 / 12	4	6 / 8	4
1986	336,661	55.88%	1st	7 / 11	2	6 / 8	0
1989	330,869	53.90%	1st	7 / 11	0	6 / 8	0
1993	342,977	51.50%	1st	7 / 11	0	6 / 8	0
1996	339,903	48.43%	1st	6 / 11	1	6 / 8	0
2000	293,831	44.71%	2nd	5 / 11	1	2 / 8	4
2004	356,826	51.22%	1st	5 / 10	0	6 / 8	4
2008	365,752	52.29%	1st	5 / 10	0	6 / 8	0
2011	246,514	37.19%	2nd	4 / 10	1	2 / 8	4
2015	233,251	35.98%	1st	5 / 10	1	4 / 8	2
2016	212,159	34.54%	2nd	4 / 10	1	2 / 8	2
2019 (Apr)	250,180	38.07%	1st	5 / 10	1	6 / 8	4
2019 (Nov)	227,447	38.33%	1st	5 / 10	0	6 / 8	0

=== European Parliament ===
European Parliament
Election	Extremadura		
Election	Votes	%	#
1987	296,914	49.94%	1st
1989	266,500	54.79%	1st
1994	248,375	45.02%	1st
1999	299,768	46.51%	1st
2004	228,083	52.24%	1st
2009	219,531	48.59%	1st
2014	151,738	38.72%	1st
2019	278,056	46.02%	1st
