= 2026 Spanish regional elections =

- 8 February 2026; 15 March 2026; 17 May 2026

At least 258 seats in the regional parliaments of Andalusia, Aragon and Castile and León
Regional administrations by leading party in 2026
National parties
PP (11+2)
PSOE (3)
Regional parties
PSC (Note: PSOE's sister party in Catalonia.) (1)
EAJ/PNV (1)
CCa (1)

Regional elections will be held in Spain during 2026 to elect the regional parliaments of at least three of the seventeen autonomous communities: Andalusia, Aragon and Castile and León. At least 258 of 1,212 seats in the regional parliaments will be up for election. The elections were held on 8 February in Aragon, on 15 March in Castile and León, and on 17 May in Andalusia. Additional elections may be held throughout the year in the event of early dissolutions being triggered in other regions.

== Election date ==
Determination of election day varies depending on the autonomous community. Typically, most autonomous communities hold their elections on the fourth Sunday of May every four years, concurrently with nationwide local elections, while others have their own, separate electoral cycles. In some cases, regional presidents have the prerogative to dissolve parliament and call for extra elections at a different time, but newly elected assemblies are restricted to serving out what remain of their previous four year-terms without altering the period to their next ordinary election. In other cases—Andalusia (since 1994), Aragon (2007), the Balearic Islands (2007), the Basque Country (1981), the Canary Islands (2018), Castile and León (2007), Catalonia (1985), Extremadura (2011), Galicia (1985), Navarre (2010) and the Valencian Community (2006)—the law grants regional presidents the power to call snap elections resulting in fresh four-year parliamentary terms.

== Regional governments ==
The following table lists party control in autonomous communities and cities. Gains for a party are highlighted in that party's colour.

Election day	Region	Previous control	New control
8 February	Aragon	People's Party (PP)	People's Party (PP)
15 March	Castile and León	People's Party (PP)	People's Party (PP)
17 May	Andalusia	People's Party (PP)	People's Party (PP)

== Summary by region ==
=== February (Aragon) ===
Parties and alliances	Votes	%	±pp	Seats	+/−
PP	228,388	34.17	−1.34	26	−2
PSOE	162,925	24.38	–5.17	18	–5
Vox	119,281	17.85	+6.60	14	+7
CHA	65,118	9.74	+4.47	6	+3
Existe	23,616	3.53	–1.43	2	–1
IU–MS	19,832	2.97	–0.16	1	±0
SALF	18,256	2.73	New	0	±0
PAR	8,329	1.25	–0.84	0	–1
Podemos–AV	6,478	0.97	–3.05	0	–1
Others	8,761	1.31		0	±0
Blank ballots	7,315	1.09	–0.53		
Valid votes	668,299	99.07	+0.30		
Invalid votes	6,271	0.93	–0.30		
Votes cast / turnout	674,570	65.09	–1.45		
Registered voters	1,036,331				

=== March (Castile and León) ===
Parties and alliances	Votes	%	±pp	Seats	+/−
PP	444,296	35.39	+3.99	33	+2
PSOE	386,774	30.81	+0.79	30	+2
Vox	237,100	18.89	+1.25	14	+1
UPL	54,096	4.31	+0.03	3	±0
IU–MS–VQ	28,255	2.25	n/a	0	±0
SALF	17,554	1.40	New	0	±0
XAV	11,518	0.92	−0.22	1	±0
Podemos–AV	9,597	0.76	n/a	0	−1
SY	9,145	0.73	−0.86	1	−2
Cs	4,509	0.36	−4.14	0	−1
Others	33,909	2.70		0	±0
Blank ballots	18,570	1.48	+0.48		
Valid votes	1,255,323	98.70	−0.21		
Invalid votes	16,573	1.30	+0.21		
Votes cast / turnout	1,271,896	60.63	+1.88		
Registered voters	2,097,803				

=== May (Andalusia) ===
Parties and alliances	Votes	%	±pp	Seats	+/−
PP	1,744,728	41.56	−1.56	53	−5
PSOE–A	955,584	22.76	−1.34	28	−2
Vox	580,293	13.82	+0.35	15	+1
AA	403,560	9.61	+5.03	8	+6
PorA	266,213	6.34	−1.36	5	±0
SALF	106,322	2.53	New	0	±0
Others	100,839	2.41		0	±0
Blank ballots	40,694	0.97	−0.03		
Valid votes	4,198,233	98.91	+0.03		
Invalid votes	46,181	1.09	−0.03		
Votes cast / turnout	4,244,414	62.30	+6.17		
Registered voters	6,812,876				

== Bibliography ==
- Ley Orgánica 5/1985, de 19 de junio, del Régimen Electoral General (Organic Law 5/1985). Official State Gazette (in Spanish). 19 June 1985 [version as of 14 July 2025]. BOE-A-1985-11672.
