= People's Party of Extremadura =

People's Party of Extremadura Partido Popular de Extremadura
- President: María Guardiola
- Secretary-General: Abel Bautista
- Founded: 1989
- Headquarters: Calle Adriano, 14; Mérida, Extremadura
- Ideology: Christian democracy Conservatism; Regionalism
- Political position: Centre-right to right-wing
- National affiliation: People's Party
- Assembly of Extremadura: 29 / 65
- Congress of Deputies: 4 / 9 (Extremaduran seats)
- Senate: 3 / 10 (Extremaduran seats)

Website
- ppextremadura.com

The People's Party of Extremadura (Spanish: Partido Popular de Extremadura, PP) is the regional section of the People's Party of Spain (PP) in Extremadura. It was formed in 1989 from the re-foundation of the People's Alliance. Its current leader since 2022 is María Guardiola.

== Electoral performance ==
=== Assembly of Extremadura ===
Assembly of Extremadura
Election	Leading candidate	Votes	%	Seats	Gov.
1991	Luis Ramallo	155,485	26.8 (#2)	19 / 65	No
1995	Juan Ignacio Barrero	259,703	39.5 (#2)	27 / 65	No
1999	Juan Ignacio Barrero	258,657	40.0 (#2)	28 / 65	No
2003	Carlos Floriano	255,808	38.7 (#2)	26 / 65	No
2007 (Note: Electoral alliance with EU.)	Carlos Floriano	257,392	38.7 (#2)	27 / 65	No
2011	José Antonio Monago	307,975	46.1 (#1)	32 / 65	Yes
2015	José Antonio Monago	236,266	37.0 (#2)	28 / 65	No
2019	José Antonio Monago	168,589	27.5 (#2)	20 / 65	No
2023	María Guardiola	237,384	38.8 (#2)	28 / 65	Yes
2025	María Guardiola	228,991	43.1 (#1)	29 / 65	Yes

=== Cortes Generales ===
Cortes Generales
Election	Extremadura						
Election	Congress					Senate	
Election	Vote	%	Score	Seats	+/–	Seats	+/–
1989	153,261	25.0	2nd	4 / 11	0	2 / 8	0
1993	238,191	35.8	2nd	4 / 11	0	2 / 8	0
1996	282,698	40.3	2nd	5 / 11	1	2 / 8	0
2000	310,850	47.3	1st	6 / 11	1	6 / 8	4
2004	295,326	42.4	2nd	5 / 10	1	2 / 8	4
2008	292,453	41.8	2nd	5 / 10	0	2 / 8	0
2011	339,237	51.2	1st	6 / 10	1	6 / 8	4
2015	225,564	34.8	2nd	4 / 10	2	4 / 8	2
2016	245,022	39.9	1st	5 / 10	1	6 / 8	2
Apr-2019	140,249	21.4	2nd	2 / 10	3	2 / 8	4
Nov-2019	154,269	26.0	2nd	3 / 10	1	2 / 8	0
2023	237,701	37.9	2nd	4 / 9	1	4 / 8	2

=== European Parliament ===
European Parliament
Election	Extremadura		
Election	Vote	%	Score
1989	105,886	21.8	2nd
1994	221,889	40.2	2nd
1999	274,196	42.5	2nd
2004	188,834	43.2	2nd
2009	199,374	44.1	2nd
2014	139,404	35.6	2nd
2019	155,330	25.8	2nd
2024	170,835	41.4	1st
