= María Guardiola =

Spanish politician (born 1978)

The Most Excellent María Guardiola
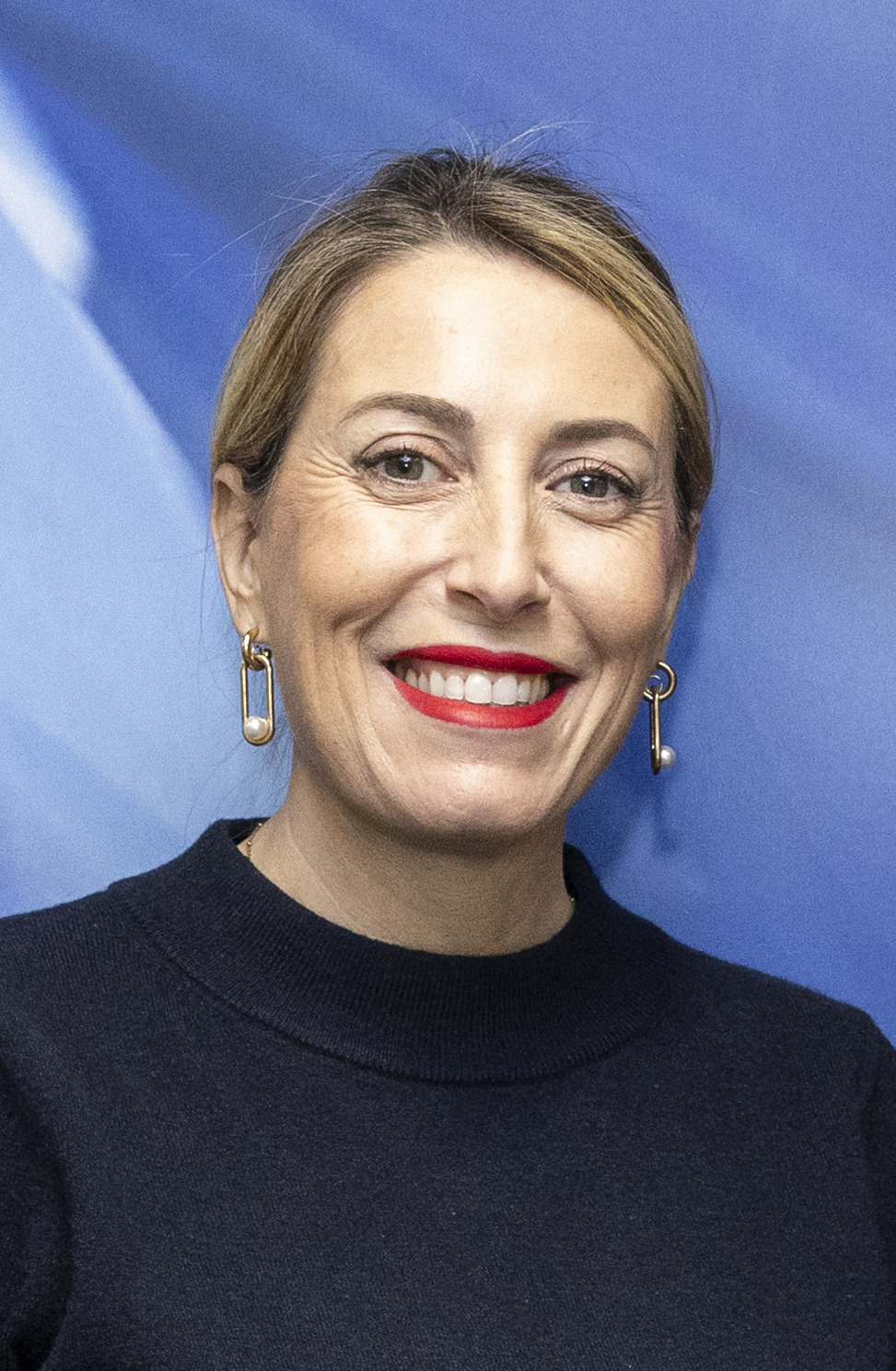
- Guardiola in 2025

President of the Regional Government of Extremadura
- Incumbent
- Assumed office 14 July 2023
- Monarch: Felipe VI
- Preceded by: Guillermo Fernández Vara

President of the People's Party in Extremadura
- Incumbent
- Assumed office 16 July 2022
- Preceded by: José Antonio Monago

Member of the Assembly of Extremadura
- Incumbent
- Assumed office 20 June 2023
- Constituency: Cáceres

Member of the Cáceres City Council
- In office 13 June 2015 – 21 July 2022

Personal details
- Born: María Guardiola Martín; 5 December 1978 (age 47) Cáceres, Spain
- Party: PP
- Children: 2
- Education: University of Extremadura

María Guardiola Martín (born 5 December 1978) is a Spanish People's Party (PP) politician serving as the President of the Autonomous Government of Extremadura since 2023. After two decades as a civil servant within the Government of Extremadura, Guardiola was elected to the city council in her hometown of Cáceres in 2015.

Guardiola resigned from her city council seat in 2022 when she was elected leader of the People's Party of Extremadura, the first woman to lead one of Extremadura's two main parties. As its lead candidate in the 2023 Extremaduran regional election, Guardiola's party won an equal number of seats to the incumbent Spanish Socialist Workers' Party (PSOE). She formed a coalition government with Vox in which she would be president; the coalition collapsed due to national issues in 2024. After her minority government was unable to pass a budget, she called a snap election for December 2025, in which her party was the most voted but still short of a majority, and agreed a new coalition with Vox.

== Early and personal life ==
Guardiola was born in Cáceres, Extremadura. When she was three years old, her father abandoned the household. She, her mother and her brother moved into her grandparents' house for financial reasons; she has two younger half-sisters from her mother's second marriage. She idolised Mother Teresa as a child. As of 2023, she is married and has a daughter and a son.

Guardiola graduated in Business Administration and Management, and Business Sciences, both from the University of Extremadura. She then worked for over two decades as a civil servant within the Government of Extremadura.

== Political career ==
=== Local politics ===
A member of the People's Party (PP), Guardiola was elected to her hometown's city hall in 2015, serving as the councillor in charge of the economy under mayor Elena Nevado. She won a second term in 2019, though her party lost control, and remained there until her resignation in July 2022.

=== Election as regional party leader ===
In 2022, Guardiola was the only candidate who received the necessary signatures to run for the leadership of the People's Party of Extremadura, replacing José Antonio Monago who had held the role since 2008. Her only previous experience in elected office was in her hometown's city council, where the PP was in opposition, and she became the first woman to lead one of the region's two major parties. She was chosen by national party leader Pablo Casado as part of a trend of the party selecting municipal politicians for regional candidacies, and the party endorsement was carried over by Casado's successor Alberto Núñez Feijóo. Fernando Pizarro, the three-term mayor of Plasencia – the fourth largest city in the region – ran a grassroots campaign but withdrew with a week remaining to focus on re-election, leaving Guardiola as the only candidate.

=== President of Extremadura ===
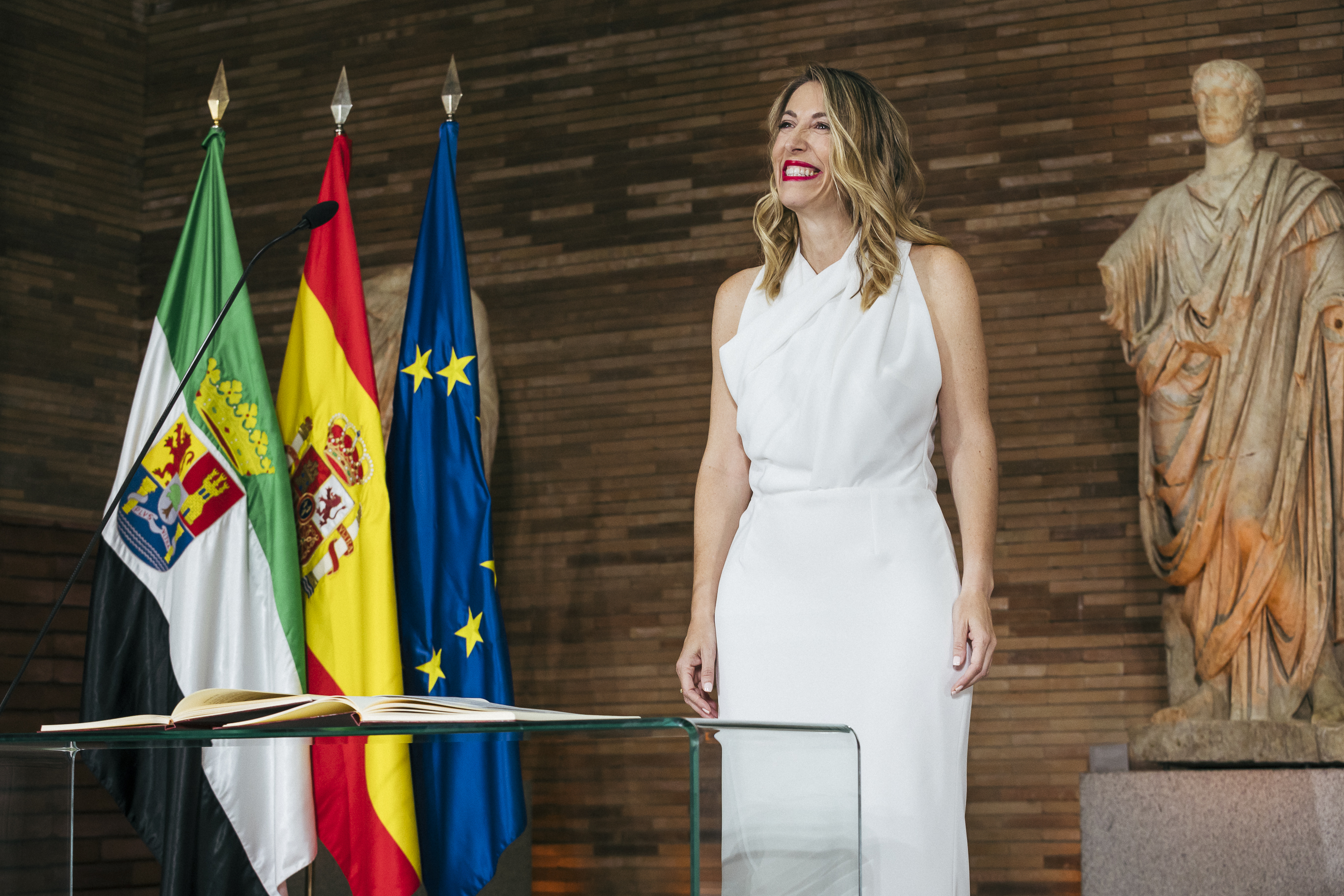
Guardiola assuming office as President of the Regional Government of Extremadura, in the National Museum of Roman Art in Mérida.

In the 2023 Extremaduran regional election, the governing Spanish Socialist Workers' Party (PSOE) and the PP drew with 28 seats each, though the former had more votes. Guardiola began negotiating with the five deputies of Vox to form a majority government. Her actions went against the instructions of Feijóo, who demanded that all assemblies and councils be run by the most voted party, instead of what he called a "pact of losers"; this was in reference to the PSOE forming governments with minor left-wing and nationalist parties. Guardiola initially rejected a pact with Vox, due to their positions on gender-related violence, immigration and LGBT rights, and supported standing in a re-run election. On 30 June, she formed a pact in which she would be President of the Regional Government of Extremadura and Vox would run the Ministry of Rural Affairs; she was invested on 14 July with the votes of the PP and Vox. During the disagreements between the two parties, the PSOE candidate Blanca Martín was re-elected President of the Assembly, the position of speaker.

In July 2024, Vox's national leader Santiago Abascal announced the withdrawal of his party from PP-led coalitions in five autonomous governments, including Extremadura, due to a dispute about migration. In March 2025, the two parties joined together to repeal of the Historical Memory Law as per their 2023 platform, in exchange for Vox's support on tax issues.

On 27 October 2025, having been unable to pass the new year's budget due to the opposition of Vox and the PSOE, Guardiola dissolved parliament and called a regional election for 21 December. The PP gained one seat while the PSOE under new leader Miguel Ángel Gallardo lost ten, making Guardiola's party the largest in the Assembly of Extremadura, but still short of the target of an absolute majority.

Guardiola's investiture as president failed in March 2026 due to Vox's opposition. The following month, the PP and Vox reached an agreement, with which Vox would receive the vice presidency, two ministries and the Senate place designated by the Assembly.

== Political views ==
Guardiola has been likened to Isabel Díaz Ayuso, another PP member who was relatively unknown when selected by the party as a regional candidate, and who was elected President of the Community of Madrid. Guardiola dismissed the comparisons. In June 2023, between Guardiola's refusal to form a pact with Vox and the pact being formed, Mayte Alcaraz of El Debate likened Guardiola to Ayuso for refusing to form a coalition but also Andalusia president Juanma Moreno and former Community of Madrid president Cristina Cifuentes for espousing centrism.

In September 2022, Guardiola received attention for applauding a campaign by the Ministry of Equality led by Podemos politician Irene Montero, which aimed to create "hombres blandengues", men who would take tasks and characteristics not associated with traditional gender roles. Two months later, she called on Montero to resign for accusing the PP of rape culture, which Guardiola considered the "gravest and repugnant" example of "political violence"; Guardiola defined herself as a feminist who aims to unite and not divide.
