= Podemos Extremadura =

- Secretary-General: Irene de Miguel
- Founded: 2014
- Ideology: Left-wing populism Progressivism; Republicanism; Federalism; Democratic socialism
- Political position: Left-wing
- National affiliation: Podemos
- Regional affiliation: Unidas por Extremadura (since 2019)
- Assembly of Extremadura: 3 / 65

Website
- extremadura.podemos.info

Podemos Extremadura is the regional branch in Extremadura of Podemos. The Secretary General is Irene de Miguel.

== Electoral performance ==
=== Assembly of Extremadura ===
Assembly of Extremadura
Election	Votes	%	#	Seats	+/–	Leading candidate	Status in legislature
2015	51,216	8.04%	3rd	6 / 65	-	Álvaro Jaén	Government support
2019	44,309	7.20%	3rd	4 / 65	2	Irene de Miguel	Opposition
