= Guillermo Fernández Vara =

Spanish politician (1958–2025)

The Most Excellent Guillermo Fernández Vara
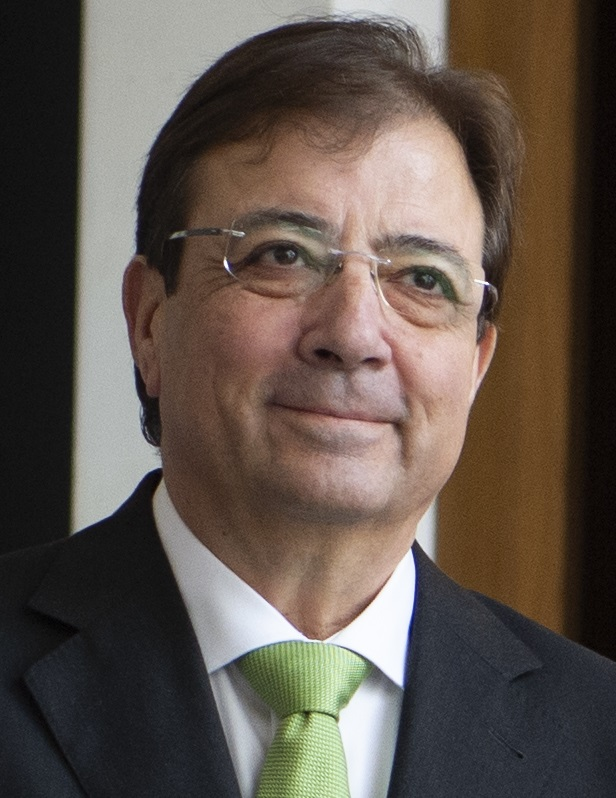
- Fernández Vara in 2022

President of the Regional Government of Extremadura
- In office 4 July 2015 – 14 July 2023
- Monarch: Felipe VI
- Administration: Second government of Guillermo Fernández Vara; Third government of Guillermo Fernández Vara
- Preceded by: José Antonio Monago
- Succeeded by: María Guardiola
- In office 29 June 2007 – 8 July 2011
- Monarch: Juan Carlos I
- Preceded by: Juan Carlos Rodríguez Ibarra
- Succeeded by: José Antonio Monago

Second Vice President of the Senate of Spain
- In office 17 August 2023 – 5 October 2025
- Preceded by: Pío García-Escudero
- Succeeded by: Concha Andreu

Secretary-General of the Socialist Workers' Party of Extremadura
- In office 19 July 2008 – 23 March 2024
- Preceded by: Juan Carlos Rodríguez Ibarra
- Succeeded by: Miguel Ángel Gallardo

Regional Minister of Health and Consumption of the Autonomous Government of Extremadura
- In office 21 July 1999 – 29 June 2007
- President: Juan Carlos Rodríguez Ibarra
- Preceded by: Office created
- Succeeded by: María Jesús Mejuto Carril

Regional Minister of Social Welfare of the Autonomous Government of Extremadura
- In office 12 January 1996 – 21 July 1999
- President: Juan Carlos Rodríguez Ibarra
- Preceded by: Maria Emilia Manzano Pereira
- Succeeded by: Ana Garrido Chamorro

Member of the Senate
- In office 20 July 2023 – 5 October 2025
- Appointed by: Assembly of Extremadura

Member of the Assembly of Extremadura
- In office 17 June 2003 – 19 June 2024
- Constituency: Badajoz

Personal details
- Born: 6 October 1958 Olivenza, Extremadura, Spain
- Died: 5 October 2025 (aged 66) Badajoz, Spain
- Party: PSOE
- Education: University of Córdoba

Guillermo Fernández Vara (6 October 1958 – 5 October 2025) was a Spanish politician and coroner who served as President of the Regional Government of Extremadura from 2007 to 2011 and from 2015 to 2023. He served as a senator, and was vice president of the Senate, representing the Assembly of Extremadura.

== Career ==
Fernández Vara studied medicine at the University of Córdoba. In 1986 he joined the National Corps of Forensic Doctors and in 1988 he was assigned to his native Extremadura, where he also served as associated professor of the University of Extremadura.

In 1990 he performed the autopsies of some victims of the Puerto Hurraco massacre and participated on the elaboration of a psychiatric profile of the shooters.

He joined the Spanish Socialist Workers' Party and became friends with the regional president, Juan Carlos Rodríguez Ibarra. During Rodríguez Ibarra's governments, he served as Director-General for Public Health and Consumer Affairs (1995–1996), Regional Minister for Social Welfare (1996–1999) and Regional Minister for Health and Consumer Affairs (1999–2007).

Following the regional president's decision to retire, Fernández Vara was elected President of the Regional Government of Extremadura after the 2007 regional election. He lost the 2011 election but won again in 2015, serving two terms until 2023, when a conservative coalition ousted him from government.

In July 2023, the Assembly of Extremadura nominated him as senator. A month later, he was elected Second Vice President of the Senate.

In 2008 he was awarded the Grand Cross of the Civil Order of Health.

== Death ==
Fernández Vara died of stomach cancer on 5 October 2025 at the age of 66. Two days later, the Council of Ministers posthumously awarded him the Grand Cross of the Order of Charles III.

== See also ==
- Second government of Guillermo Fernández Vara
- Third government of Guillermo Fernández Vara

Political offices
Preceded by María Emilia Manzano	Regionla Minister of Social Welfare of Extremadura; 1996–1999	Succeeded by Ana Garrido Chamorro
Preceded by Office created	Regionla Minister of Health and Consumption of Extremadura; 1999–2007	Succeeded by María Jesús Mejuto
Preceded by Juan Carlos Rodríguez Ibarra	President of the Autonomous Government of Extremadura; 2007–2011	Succeeded by José Antonio Monago
Preceded by José Antonio Monago	President of the Autonomous Government of Extremadura; 2015–2023	Succeeded by María Guardiola
Party political offices
Preceded by Juan Carlos Rodríguez Ibarra	Secretary-General of the Socialist Workers' Party of Extremadura; 2008–2024	Succeeded by Miguel Ángel Gallardo
