= Assembly of Extremadura =

Coordinates: 38.917457553486784°N 6.347710727399693°W

Assembly of Extremadura Asamblea de Extremadura Parlamento de Extremadura
- Extremadura unicameral legislature

Type
- Type: Spanish regional legislature
- Houses: Unicameral

Leadership
- President: Manuel Naharro, PP since 20 January 2026
- Vice President: Domingo Expósito, PP since 20 January 2026
- Second Vice President: Eduardo Béjar, PSOE since 20 January 2026
- Secretary: Beatriz Muñoz, Vox since 20 January 2026
- Second Secretary: Isabel Babiano, PP since 20 January 2026
- Third Secretary: Francisco Llera, UxE since 20 January 2026

Structure
- Seats: 65
- Political groups: Government (40): PP (29); Vox (11); Opposition (25): PSOE (18); Podemos–IU–AV (7) (Note: IU (4); Podemos (3))
- Length of term: 4 years

Elections
- Last election: 21 December 2025
- Next election: By 20 January 2030

Meeting place
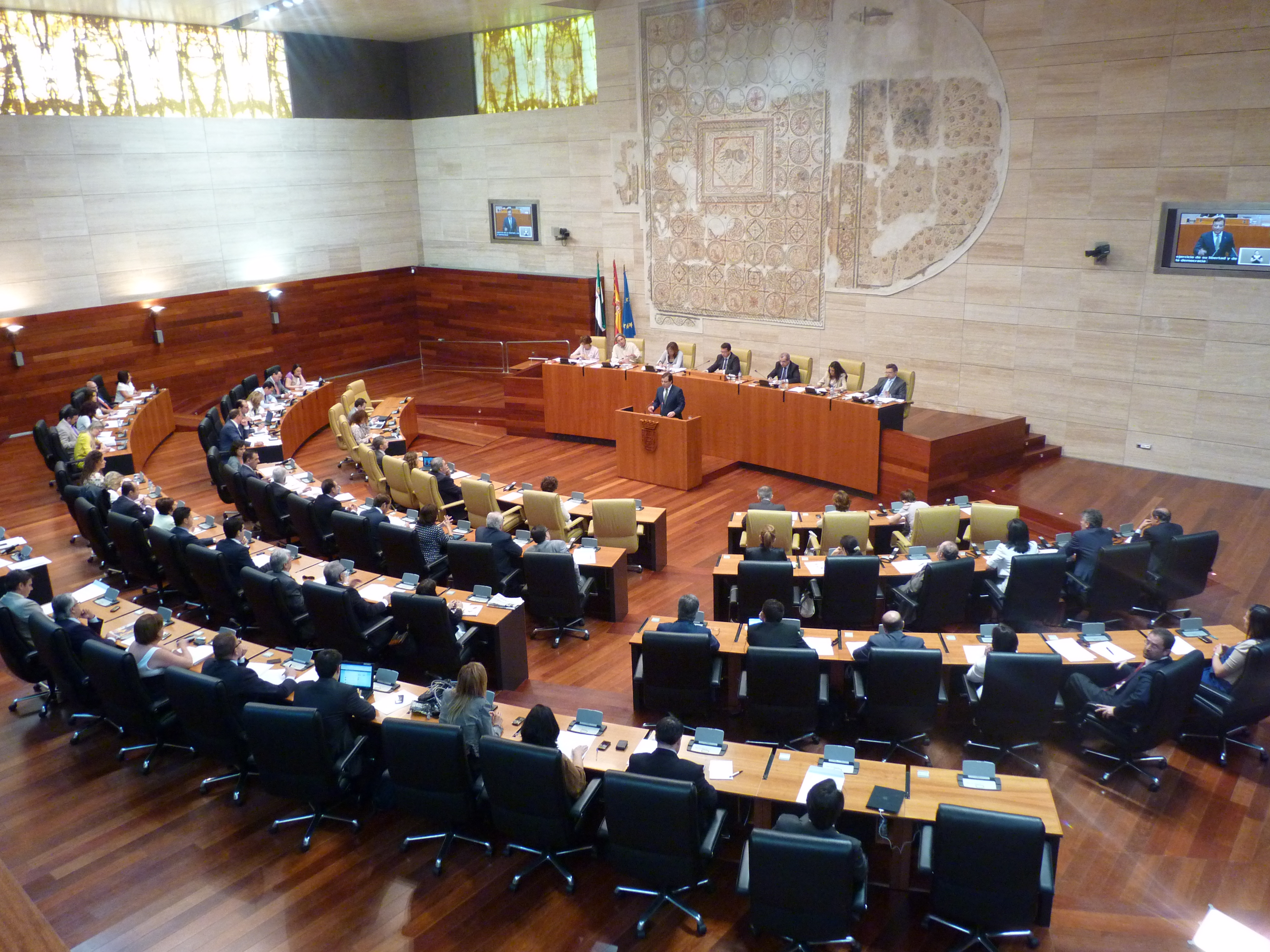
- Parliamentary chamber Mérida, Extremadura

Website
- Parlamento de Extremadura

The Assembly of Extremadura (Spanish: Asamblea de Extremadura; also called Parlamento de Extremadura) is the elected unicameral legislature of the Autonomous Community of Extremadura.

The electoral period is four years.

The Assembly of Extremadura is seated at the old Hospital of San Juan de Dios, in Mérida, the capital of the autonomous community. The session room features a 5th-century mosaic found in 1978 near the Roman Theatre.

== Results of the elections to the Assembly of Extremadura ==
Deputies in Assembly of Extremadura since 1983
Key to parties Podemos PCE IU EU PSOE UPyD UCD Cs CDS CD PP CP AP Vox
Election	Distribution	President
1983	4 / 35 / 6 / 20	Juan Carlos Rodríguez Ibarra (PSOE)
1987	2 / 34 / 8 / 4 / 17	Juan Carlos Rodríguez Ibarra (PSOE)
1991	4 / 39 / 3 / 19	Juan Carlos Rodríguez Ibarra (PSOE)
1995	6 / 31 / 1 / 27	Juan Carlos Rodríguez Ibarra (PSOE)
1999	3 / 34 / 28	Juan Carlos Rodríguez Ibarra (PSOE)
May 2003	3 / 36 / 26	Juan Carlos Rodríguez Ibarra (PSOE)
2007	38 / 27	Guillermo Fernández Vara (PSOE)
2011	3 / 30 / 32	José Antonio Monago (PP)
2015	6 / 30 / 1 / 28	Guillermo Fernández Vara (PSOE)
2019	4 / 34 / 7 / 20	Guillermo Fernández Vara (PSOE)
2023	4 / 28 / 28 / 5	María Guardiola Martín (PP)
2025	7 / 18 / 29 / 11	María Guardiola Martín (PP)
