= 2011 Extremaduran regional election =

Election in the Spanish region of Extremadura

- 22 May 2011

All 65 seats in the Assembly of Extremadura 33 seats needed for a majority
- Opinion polls
- Registered: 906,551 ▲1.5%
- Turnout: 676,768 (74.7%) ▼0.3 pp
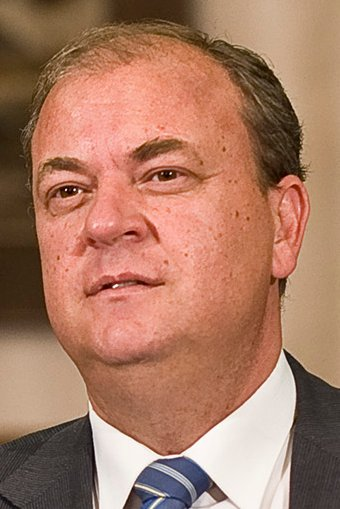

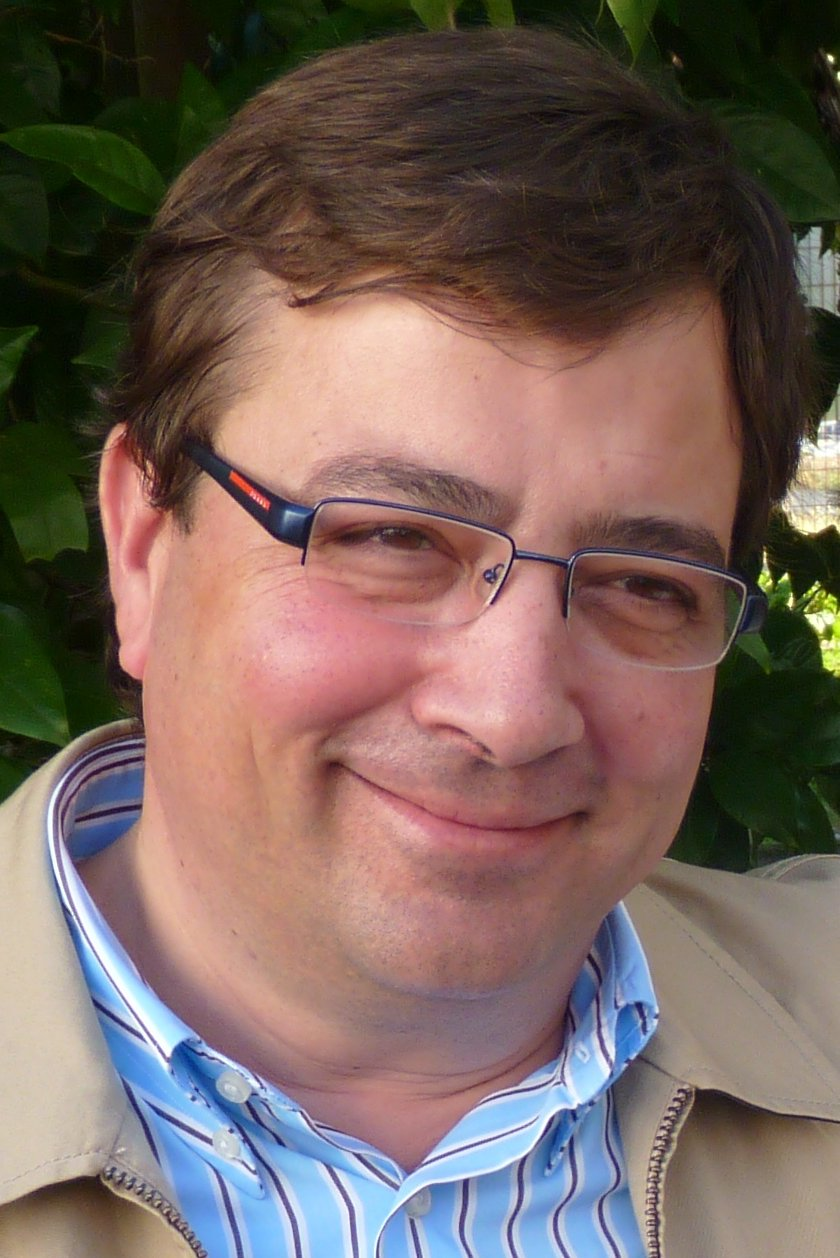

	First party	Second party	Third party
Leader	José Antonio Monago	Guillermo Fernández Vara	Pedro Escobar
Party	PP–EU	PSOE–r	IU–SIEx
Leader since	8 November 2008	20 September 2006	30 September 2007
Leader's seat	Badajoz	Badajoz	Badajoz
Last election	27 seats, 38.7%	38 seats, 53.0%	0 seats, 4.5%
Seats won	32	30	3
Seat change	▲5	▼8	▲3
Popular vote	307,975	290,045	38,157
Percentage	46.1%	43.4%	5.7%
Swing	▲7.4 pp	▼9.6 pp	▲1.2 pp
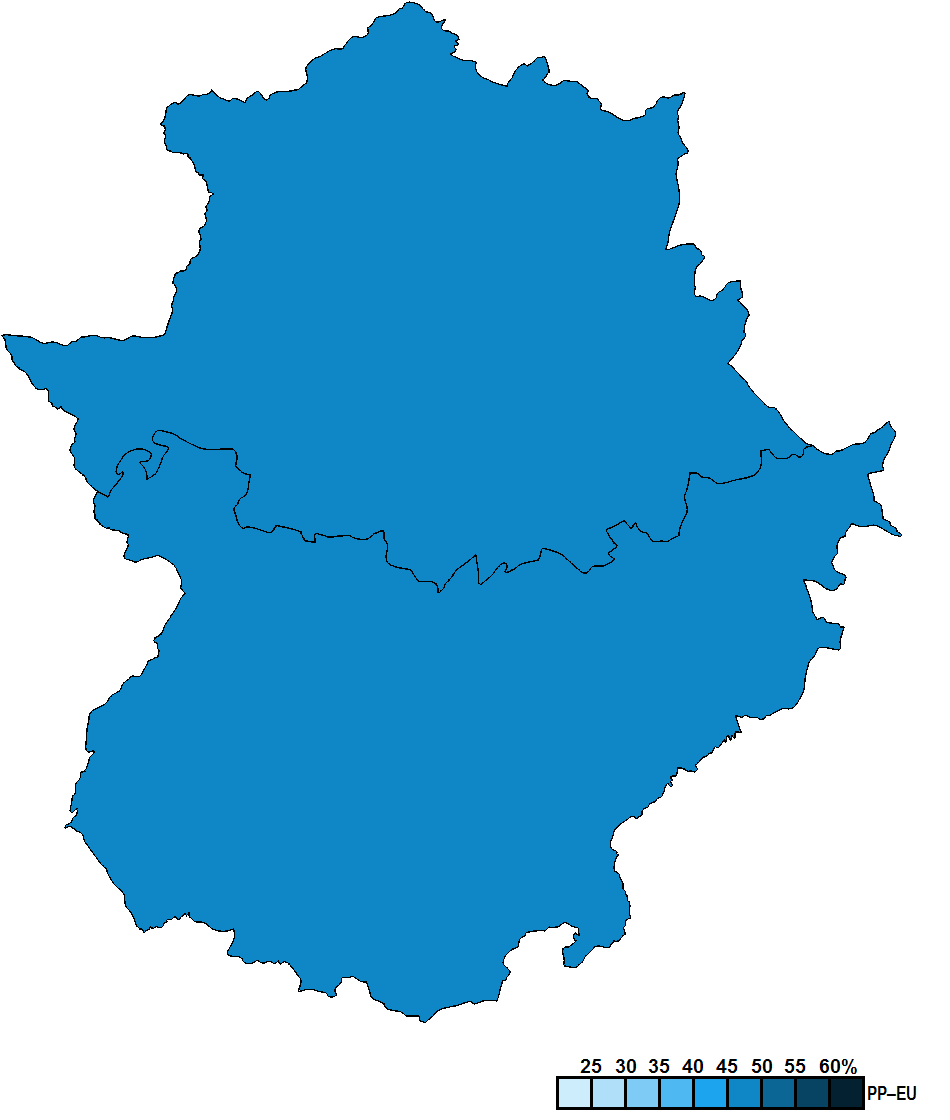
- Constituency results map for the Assembly of Extremadura
President before election
Guillermo Fernández Vara
PSOE
President after election
José Antonio Monago
PP

A regional election was held in Extremadura on 22 May 2011 to elect the 8th Assembly of the autonomous community. All 65 seats in the Assembly were up for election. It was held concurrently with regional elections in twelve other autonomous communities and local elections all across Spain.

For the first time since 1983, the People's Party (PP) was able to win a regional election, obtaining its best historical result, with 46.1% of the share and 32 seats. The Spanish Socialist Workers' Party (PSOE), which had formed the government of the Extremaduran region since 1983, achieving an absolute majority of seats at every election except in 1995, was ousted from power in the worst result obtained by the party until that time.

However, as the PP stood one seat short of an overall majority, the possibility arose of PSOE pact with United Left (IU), which had re-entered the Assembly after a four-year absence, in order to maintain the regional government. However, IU declined to support outgoing Socialist Guillermo Fernández Vara after a 24-year PSOE rule over the region, opting to abstain in the investiture voting and allowing the most-voted candidate to be elected. As a result of the PP having more seats than the PSOE, party candidate José Antonio Monago became the first not-Socialist democratically elected President of the region.

== Overview ==
Under the 2011 Statute of Autonomy, the Assembly of Extremadura was the unicameral legislature of the homonymous autonomous community, having legislative power in devolved matters, as well as the ability to grant or withdraw confidence from a regional president. The electoral and procedural rules were supplemented by national law provisions.

=== Date ===
The term of the Assembly of Extremadura expired four years after the date of its previous election. Amendments earlier in 2011 abolished fixed-term elections, instead allowing the term of the Assembly to expire after an early dissolution. The election decree was required to be issued no later than 25 days before the scheduled expiration date of parliament and published on the following day in the Official Journal of Extremadura (DOE), with election day taking place 54 days after the decree's publication. The previous election was held on 27 May 2007, which meant that the chamber's term would have expired on 27 May 2011. The election decree was required to be published in the DOE no later than 3 May 2011, setting the latest possible date for election day on 26 June 2011.

The regional president had the prerogative to dissolve the Assembly of Extremadura at any given time and call a snap election, provided that no motion of no confidence was in process and that dissolution did not occur before one year after a previous one. In the event of an investiture process failing to elect a regional president within a two-month period from the first ballot, the Assembly was to be automatically dissolved and a fresh election called.

The election to the Assembly of Extremadura was officially called on 29 March 2011 with the publication of the corresponding decree in the DOE, setting election day for 22 May.

=== Electoral system ===
Voting for the Assembly was based on universal suffrage, comprising all Spanish nationals over 18 years of age, registered in Extremadura and with full political rights, provided that they had not been deprived of the right to vote by a final sentence, nor were legally incapacitated. Amendments earlier in 2011 required non-resident citizens to apply for voting, a system known as "begged" voting (Spanish: Voto rogado).

The Assembly of Extremadura had a maximum of 65 seats, with electoral provisions fixing its size at that number. All were elected in two multi-member constituencies—corresponding to the provinces of Badajoz and Cáceres, each of which was assigned an initial minimum of 20 seats and the remaining 25 distributed in proportion to population—using the D'Hondt method and closed-list proportional voting, with a five percent-threshold of valid votes (including blank ballots) in each constituency. Alternatively, parties could also enter the seat distribution as long as they ran candidates in both constituencies and reached five percent regionally.

As a result of the aforementioned allocation, each Assembly constituency was entitled the following seats:

Seats	Constituencies
36	Badajoz^{(+1)}
29	Cáceres^{(−1)}

The law did not provide for by-elections to fill vacant seats; instead, any vacancies arising after the proclamation of candidates and during the legislative term were filled by the next candidates on the party lists or, when required, by designated substitutes.

=== Outgoing parliament ===
The table below shows the composition of the parliamentary groups in the chamber at the time of the election call.

Parliamentary composition in March 2011
Groups	Parties	Legislators	
Groups	Parties	Seats	Total
Socialist Parliamentary Group	PSOE	35	38
Socialist Parliamentary Group	PREx–CREx	3	38
People's–United Extremadura Parliamentary Group	PP	26	27
People's–United Extremadura Parliamentary Group	EU	1	27

== Parties and candidates ==
The electoral law allowed for parties and federations registered in the interior ministry, alliances and groupings of electors to present lists of candidates. Parties and federations intending to form an alliance were required to inform the relevant electoral commission within 10 days of the election call, whereas groupings of electors needed to secure the signature of at least two percent of the electorate in the constituencies for which they sought election, disallowing electors from signing for more than one list. Additionally, a balanced composition of men and women was required in the electoral lists, so that candidates of either sex made up at least 40 percent of the total composition.

Below is a list of the main parties and alliances which contested the election:

Candidacy	Parties and alliances	Candidate	Ideology	Previous result		Gov.	Ref.
Candidacy	Parties and alliances	Candidate	Ideology	Vote %	Seats	Gov.	Ref.
PSOE–r	List: Spanish Socialist Workers' Party (PSOE); Extremaduran Coalition (PREx–CREx) – Extremaduran Regionalist Party (PREx) – Regionalist Convergence of Extremadura (CREx)	Guillermo Fernández Vara	Social democracy	53.0%	38	Yes	
PP–EU	List: People's Party (PP); United Extremadura (EU)	José Antonio Monago	Conservatism; Christian democracy	38.7%	27	No	
IU–SIEx	List: United Left (IU) – Communist Party of Extremadura (PCEx) – Revolutionary Workers' Party (POR) – Republican Left (IR); Independent Socialists of Extremadura (SIEx)	Pedro Escobar	Socialism; Communism	4.5%	0	No	

== Opinion polls ==
The tables below list opinion polling results in reverse chronological order, showing the most recent first and using the dates when the survey fieldwork was done, as opposed to the date of publication. Where the fieldwork dates are unknown, the date of publication is given instead. The highest percentage figure in each polling survey is displayed with its background shaded in the leading party's colour. If a tie ensues, this is applied to the figures with the highest percentages. The "Lead" column on the right shows the percentage-point difference between the parties with the highest percentages in a poll.

=== Voting intention estimates ===
The table below lists weighted voting intention estimates. Refusals are generally excluded from the party vote percentages, while question wording and the treatment of "don't know" responses and those not intending to vote may vary between polling organisations. When available, seat projections determined by the polling organisations are displayed below (or in place of) the percentages in a smaller font; 33 seats were required for an absolute majority in the Assembly of Extremadura.

Polling firm/Commissioner	Fieldwork date	Sample size	Turnout	PSOE	PP	IU	UPyD	Lead
2011 regional election	22 May 2011	—N/a	74.7	43.4; 30	46.1; 32	5.7; 3	1.1; 0	2.7
Sigma Dos/El Mundo	9–11 May 2011	500	?	43.6; 30/31	48.7; 32/34	4.6; 0/3	–	5.1
NC Report/La Razón (Note: "El PP doblega al PSOE a siete días de la cita electoral". La Razón (in Spanish). 15 May 2011. Archived from the original on 3 September 2011.)	3–10 May 2011	?	?	46.8; 31/32	44.9; 31/32	? 2	–	1.9
TNS Demoscopia/Antena 3	4–5 May 2011	750	?	43.3; 30/31	46.8; 33/34	4.5; 1	–	3.5
NC Report/La Razón (Note: "El popular Monago recorta casi doce puntos a Fernández Vara". La Razón (in Spanish). 25 April 2011. Archived from the original on 26 April 2011.)	25 Apr 2011	?	?	47.1; 32/34	44.6; 31/32	? 0/1	–	2.5
Celeste-Tel/Terra	13–20 Apr 2011	600	?	44.6; 30	46.6; 32	6.8; 3	–	2.0
CIS	17 Mar–17 Apr 2011	1,200	?	45.3; 31	44.8; 32	4.8; 2	1.6; 0	0.5
Sigma Dos/El Mundo (Note: "IU podría ser decisivo en Extremadura (El Mundo)". Electómetro (in Spanish). 24 April 2011. Archived from the original on 29 April 2011.)	11–14 Apr 2011	500	?	43.8; 30/31	48.4; 32/34	4.9; 0/3	–	4.6
Ikerfel/Vocento	4–10 Apr 2011	1,200	?	44.4; 30/31	45.3; 31/32	5.6; 2/3	–	0.9
Obradoiro de Socioloxía/Público (Note: "Vara conserva la Junta, pero peligra la mayoría absoluta de los socialistas". Público (in Spanish). 4 April 2011. Archived from the original on 11 May 2014.) (Note: "IU podría ser la fuerza decisiva en Extremadura (Público)". Electómetro (in Spanish). 4 April 2011. Archived from the original on 4 March 2016.)	28 Mar–1 Apr 2011	500	?	46.8; 32/33	44.4; 31/32	4.6; 1/2	–	2.4
GESPA/PP	10–14 Jan 2011	1,200	?	44.7; 31/32	45.8; 33	4.9; 0/1	–	1.1
NC Report/La Razón (Note: "El PP conquista los grandes feudos de los socialistas". La Razón (in Spanish). 22 January 2011. Archived from the original on 5 March 2011.) (Note: "El PP, a un paso de la mayoría absoluta en Andalucía y Castilla La Mancha (La Razón)". Electómetro (in Spanish). 22 January 2011. Archived from the original on 26 January 2011.)	30 Dec–3 Jan 2011	?	?	48.1; 32/34	43.6; 30/31	? 1/2	–	4.5
Sigma Dos/El Mundo (Note: "Empate técnico entre PSOE y PP en Extremadura (El Mundo)". Electómetro (in Spanish). 5 January 2011. Archived from the original on 10 January 2011.)	28–29 Dec 2010	500	?	45.6; 32	45.5; 31/33	4.9; 0/2	–	0.1
Sigma Dos/Hoy	23–27 Dec 2010	1,000	?	45.7; 30/32	45.1; 31/32	5.3; 2/3	–	0.6
Q Índice/PSOE (Note: "El PSOE de Extremadura volvería a ganar con mayoría absoluta (encuesta interna)". Electómetro (in Spanish). 15 July 2010. Archived from the original on 14 October 2010.)	14–18 Jun 2010	702	?	49.0; 33/35	43.0; 29/30	4.5; 1/2	–	6.0
Sigma Dos/El Mundo	25–27 May 2010	500	?	44.4; 30/32	48.8; 33/35	4.0; 0	–	4.4
GESPA/PP	15–30 Mar 2010	1,200	?	46.6; 33	44.9; 32	4.4; 0	–	1.7
Obradoiro de Socioloxía/Público (Note: "El feudo más seguro del PSOE". Público (in Spanish). 28 March 2010. Archived from the original on 9 March 2012.)	15–18 Mar 2010	799	?	48.1; 33	44.4; 31	4.6; 1	–	3.7
Sigma Dos/Hoy	12–19 Feb 2010	1,200	?	48.0; 33/35	43.8; 30/32	4.2; 0	–	4.2
2009 EP election	7 Jun 2009	—N/a	50.6	48.6 (34)	44.1 (31)	2.5 (0)	1.9 (0)	4.5
2008 general election	9 Mar 2008	—N/a	78.5	52.3 (37)	41.8 (28)	2.9 (0)	0.8 (0)	10.5
2007 regional election	27 May 2007	—N/a	75.0	53.0; 38	38.7; 27	4.5; 0	–	14.3

=== Voting preferences ===
The table below lists raw, unweighted voting preferences.

Polling firm/Commissioner	Fieldwork date	Sample size	PSOE	PP	IU	UPyD	Question	X mark	Lead
2011 regional election (Note: Does not include non-resident citizens.)	22 May 2011	—N/a	32.7	34.7	4.2	0.8	—N/a	23.8	2.0
CIS	17 Mar–17 Apr 2011	1,200	34.0	29.9	3.6	1.0	24.1	4.2	4.1
Obradoiro de Socioloxía/Público	28 Mar–1 Apr 2011	500	31.6	30.7	2.6	0.7	–	–	0.9
Obradoiro de Socioloxía/Público	15–18 Mar 2010	799	29.9	27.0	2.4	0.6	–	–	2.9
2009 EP election	7 Jun 2009	—N/a	24.7	22.6	1.3	1.0	—N/a	48.6	2.1
2008 general election	9 Mar 2008	—N/a	41.3	33.2	2.3	0.6	—N/a	20.3	8.1
2007 regional election	27 May 2007	—N/a	39.9	29.3	3.4	–	—N/a	23.9	10.6

=== Victory preferences ===
The table below lists opinion polling on the victory preferences for each party in the event of a regional election taking place.

Polling firm/Commissioner	Fieldwork date	Sample size	PSOE	PP	IU	UPyD	Other/ None	Question	Lead
CIS	17 Mar–17 Apr 2011	1,200	41.2	35.4	3.6	1.3	3.9	14.7	5.8
GESPA/PP	10–14 Jan 2011	1,200	34.4	32.2	2.1	0.7	0.4	30.1	2.2

=== Victory likelihood ===
The table below lists opinion polling on the perceived likelihood of victory for each party in the event of a regional election taking place.

Polling firm/Commissioner	Fieldwork date	Sample size	PSOE	PP	IU	UPyD	Other/ None	Question	Lead
CIS	17 Mar–17 Apr 2011	1,200	52.4	24.5	0.0	0.0	0.2	22.9	27.9
GESPA/PP	10–14 Jan 2011	1,200	46.8	25.7	0.2	–	–	27.3	21.1

=== Preferred President ===
The table below lists opinion polling on leader preferences to become president of the Regional Government of Extremadura.

All candidates

Polling firm/Commissioner	Fieldwork date	Sample size					Other/ None/ Not care	Question	Lead
Polling firm/Commissioner	Fieldwork date	Sample size	Vara PSOE	Monago PP	Escobar IU	García-Borruel UPyD	Other/ None/ Not care	Question	Lead
CIS	17 Mar–17 Apr 2011	1,200	44.6	30.1	2.5	1.2	1.6	20.1	14.5
Ikerfel/Vocento	4–10 Apr 2011	1,200	48.5	32.9	2.9	–	–	15.7	15.6
GESPA/PP	10–14 Jan 2011	1,200	35.3	28.2	3.9	–	5.9	23.2	7.1

Vara vs. Monago

Polling firm/Commissioner	Fieldwork date	Sample size			Other/ None/ Not care	Question	Lead
Polling firm/Commissioner	Fieldwork date	Sample size	Vara PSOE	Monago PP	Other/ None/ Not care	Question	Lead
Obradoiro de Socioloxía/Público	28 Mar–1 Apr 2011	500	46.5	30.9	22.6		15.6
Obradoiro de Socioloxía/Público	15–18 Mar 2010	799	40.8	22.0	37.2		18.8

=== Predicted President ===
The table below lists opinion polling on the perceived likelihood for each leader to become president.

Polling firm/Commissioner	Fieldwork date	Sample size			Other/ None/ Not care	Question	Lead
Polling firm/Commissioner	Fieldwork date	Sample size	Vara PSOE	Monago PP	Other/ None/ Not care	Question	Lead
Obradoiro de Socioloxía/Público	28 Mar–1 Apr 2011	500	57.7	23.3	19.0		34.4
Obradoiro de Socioloxía/Público	15–18 Mar 2010	799	58.1	9.1	32.8		49.0

== Results ==
=== Overall ===
← Summary of the 22 May 2011 Assembly of Extremadura election results →
Parties and alliances	Popular vote			Seats	
Parties and alliances	Votes	%	±pp	Total	+/−
People's Party–United Extremadura (PP–EU)	307,975	46.13	+7.42	32	+5
Spanish Socialist Workers' Party–Regionalists (PSOE–regionalistas)	290,045	43.45	−9.55	30	−8
United Left–Independent Socialists of Extremadura (IU–SIEx)	38,157	5.72	+1.20	3	+3
Union, Progress and Democracy (UPyD)	7,058	1.06	New	0	±0
Independents for Extremadura (IPEx)	4,659	0.70	−0.56	0	±0
Ecolo–The Greens (Ecolo–LV)^{1}	3,887	0.58	−0.03	0	±0
Extremaduran People's Union (UPEx)	2,185	0.33	+0.10	0	±0
For a Fairer World (PUM+J)	1,573	0.24	New	0	±0
Convergence for Extremadura (CEx)	1,056	0.16	New	0	±0
Communist Party of the Peoples of Spain (PCPE)	836	0.13	−0.01	0	±0
Citizens for Blank Votes (CenB)	774	0.12	+0.04	0	±0
Blank ballots	9,394	1.41	+0.22		
Total	667,599			65	±0
Valid votes	667,599	98.65	−0.62		
Invalid votes	9,169	1.35	+0.62		
Votes cast / turnout	676,768	74.65	−0.30		
Abstentions	229,783	25.35	+0.30		
Registered voters	906,551				
Sources
Footnotes: ^{1} Ecolo–The Greens results are compared to The Greens of Extremadura totals in the 2007 election.

Popular vote
PP–EU	46.13%
PSOE–r	43.45%
IU–SIEx	5.72%
UPyD	1.06%
Others	2.24%
Blank ballots	1.41%

Seats
PP–EU	49.23%
PSOE–r	46.15%
IU–SIEx	4.62%

=== Distribution by constituency ===
Constituency	PP–EU		PSOE–r		IU–SIEx	
Constituency	%	S	%	S	%	S
Badajoz	45.0	17	44.7	17	6.2	2
Cáceres	47.9	15	41.4	13	5.0	1
Total	46.1	32	43.4	30	5.7	3

== Aftermath ==
=== Government formation ===
Investiture; Nomination of José Antonio Monago (PP)
Ballot →	5 July 2011	7 July 2011
Required majority →	33 out of 65	Simple
Yes: • PP–EU (32)	32 / 65	32 / 65
No: • PSOE–r (30)	30 / 65	30 / 65
Abstentions: • IU–SIEx (3)	3 / 65	3 / 65
Absentees	0 / 65	0 / 65

=== 2014 motion of no confidence ===
Motion of no confidence Nomination of Guillermo Fernández Vara (PSOE)
Ballot →	14 May 2014
Required majority →	33 out of 65
Yes: • PSOE (28); • PREx–CREx (2)	30 / 65
No: • PP–EU (32)	32 / 65
Abstentions: • IU (3)	3 / 65
Absentees	0 / 65

== Bibliography ==
- Ley Orgánica 5/1985, de 19 de junio, del Régimen Electoral General (Organic Law 5/1985). Official State Gazette (in Spanish). 19 June 1985 [version as of 30 April 2011]. BOE-A-1985-11672.
- Ley 2/1987, de 16 de marzo, de Elecciones a la Asamblea de Extremadura (Law 2/1987). Official State Gazette (in Spanish). 16 March 1987 [version as of 26 March 1991]. BOE-A-1987-8817.
- Ley 1/2002, de 28 de febrero, del Gobierno y de la Administración de la Comunidad Autónoma de Extremadura (Law 1/2002). Official State Gazette (in Spanish). 28 February 2002 [version as of 31 December 2009]. BOE-A-2002-7297.
- Ley Orgánica 1/2011, de 28 de enero, de reforma del Estatuto de Autonomía de la Comunidad Autónoma de Extremadura (Organic Law 1/2011). Official State Gazette (in Spanish). 28 January 2011 [version as of 29 January 2011]. BOE-A-2011-1638.
- Decreto del Presidente 2/2011, de 28 de marzo, por el que se convocan elecciones a la Asamblea de Extremadura (PDF) (Decree 2/2011). Official Journal of Extremadura (in Spanish). 28 March 2011. 2011030002.
