= Cáceres (Assembly of Extremadura constituency) =

Coordinates: 39°40′N 6°00′W

- Assembly of Extremadura; Electoral constituency
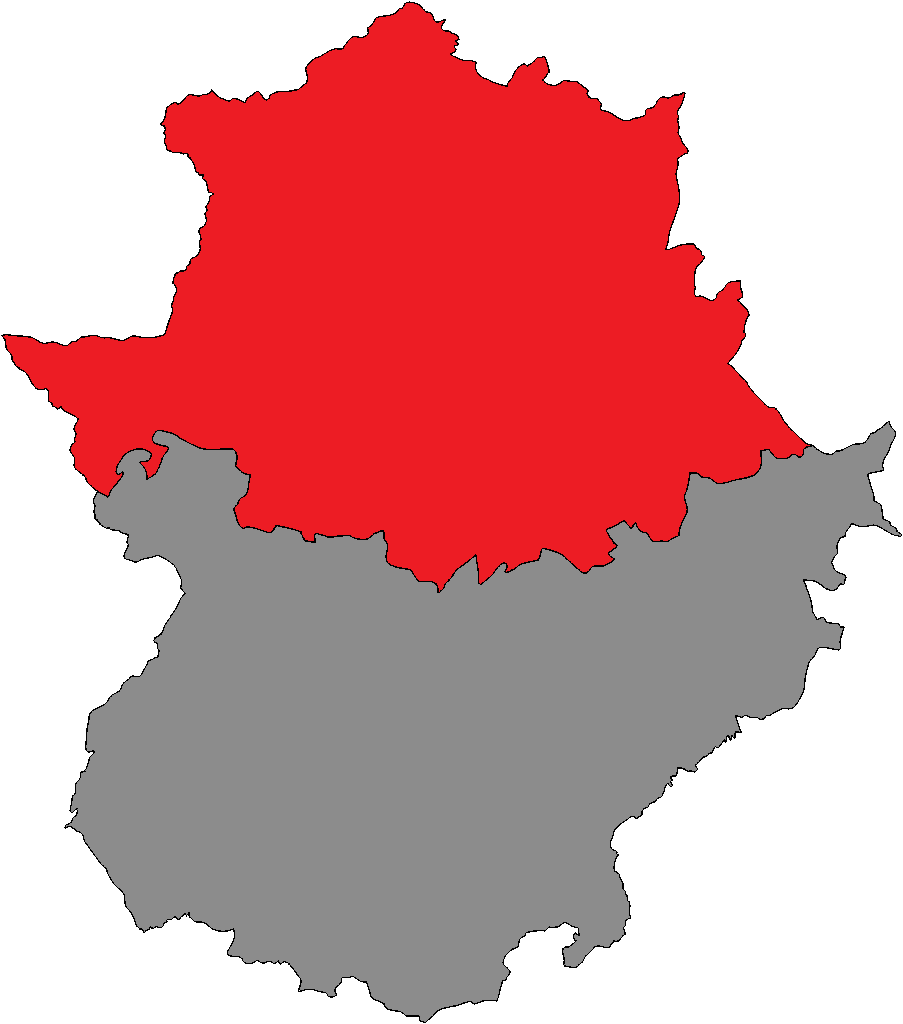
- Location of Cáceres within Extremadura
- Province: Cáceres
- Autonomous community: Extremadura
- Population: ▼387,752 (2025)
- Electorate: ▲339,614 (2025)
- Major settlements: Cáceres, Plasencia

Current constituency
- Created: 1983
- Seats: 30 (1983–1999); 29 (1999–2003); 30 (2003–2011); 29 (2011–present)
- Members: PP (13); PSOE (8); Vox (5); UxE (3)

Cáceres is one of the two constituencies (Spanish: circunscripciones) represented in the Assembly of Extremadura, the regional legislature of the Autonomous Community of Extremadura. The constituency currently elects 29 deputies. Its boundaries correspond to those of the Spanish province of Cáceres. The electoral system uses the D'Hondt method and a closed list proportional voting system, with an electoral threshold of five percent.

== Electoral system ==
The constituency was established under the Statute of Autonomy of Extremadura of 1983 and was first contested in the 1983 regional election. The Statute (reformed in 2011) provides for the two provinces in Extremadura—Badajoz and Cáceres—to be set as multi-member constituencies in the Assembly of Extremadura, each of which is assigned an initial minimum of 20 seats and the remaining ones are distributed in proportion to population. The exception was the 1983 election, when each constituency was allocated a fixed number of seats. Seats are elected using the D'Hondt method and closed-list proportional voting, with a five percent-threshold of valid votes (including blank ballots) in each constituency; alternatively, parties may also enter the seat distribution as long as they run candidates in both constituencies and reach five percent regionally. In 1983, the threshold was three percent in each constituency. The law does not provide for by-elections to fill vacant seats; instead, any vacancies arising after the proclamation of candidates and during the legislative term are filled by the next candidates on the party lists or, when required, by designated substitutes.

Voting is based on universal suffrage, comprising all Spanish nationals over 18 years of age, registered in the constituency and with full political rights. Amendments in 2011 required non-resident citizens to apply for voting, a system known as "begged" voting (Spanish: Voto rogado), which was abolished in 2022 and attributed responsibility for a major decrease in the turnout of Spaniards abroad during the years it was in force. Additionally, those legally incapacitated were also barred from voting before amendments in 2018 granted them the right to vote.

The electoral law allows for parties and federations registered in the interior ministry, alliances and groupings of electors to present lists of candidates. Parties and federations intending to form an alliance are required to inform the relevant electoral commission within 10 days of the election call—15 before 1985—whereas groupings of electors need to secure the signature of at least two percent of the electorate in the constituencies for which they seek election (before 1985 this was one permille, with a compulsory minimum of 500 signatures), disallowing electors from signing for more than one list. Amendments in 2007 required a balanced composition of men and women in the electoral lists, so that candidates of either sex made up at least 40 percent of the total composition; amendments in 2024 reinforced these through the use of a zipper system.

== Deputies ==
Deputies 1983–present
Key to parties PCE IU UxE Podemos PSOE CEx CDS Cs EU PP CP AP Vox
Assembly	Election	Distribution
1st	1983	1 / 15 / 5 / 9
2nd	1987	15 / 3 / 4 / 8
3rd	1991	1 / 18 / 1 / 10
4th	1995	2 / 14 / 1 / 13
5th	1999	1 / 15 / 13
6th	2003	1 / 16 / 13
7th	2007	17 / 13
8th	2011	1 / 13 / 15
9th	2015	3 / 12 / 1 / 13
10th	2019	2 / 14 / 3 / 10
11th	2023	2 / 12 / 13 / 2
12th	2025	3 / 8 / 13 / 5

== Regional elections ==
=== 2025 ===
Summary of the 21 December 2025 Assembly of Extremadura election results in Cáceres
Parties and alliances	Popular vote			Seats	
Parties and alliances	Votes	%	±pp	Total	+/−
People's Party (PP)	88,180	43.93	+3.80	13	±0
Spanish Socialist Workers' Party (PSOE)	50,758	25.29	−12.40	8	−4
Vox (Vox)	32,870	16.38	+7.95	5	+3
United for Extremadura We Can–United Left–Green Alliance (Podemos–IU–AV)	20,301	10.11	+4.00	3	+1
Together for Extremadura–Raise Extremadura (Juntos–Levanta)^{1}	1,777	0.89	−2.79	0	±0
United Extremadura (EU)	1,548	0.77	New	0	±0
New Extremennism–Forward Extremadura (NEx)	1,279	0.64	New	0	±0
Animalist Party with the Environment (PACMA)	831	0.41	New	0	±0
A Worthy Extremadura–Sovereignty and Work (UED–SyT)^{2}	413	0.21	−0.15	0	±0
Citizens–Party of the Citizenry (Cs)	407	0.20	−0.63	0	±0
For a Fairer World (M+J)	277	0.14	−0.01	0	±0
Blank ballots	2,082	1.04	−0.31		
Total	200,723			65	±0
Valid votes	200,723	98.06	+0.23		
Invalid votes	3,966	1.94	−0.23		
Votes cast / turnout	204,689	60.27	−9.41		
Abstentions	134,925	39.73	+9.41		
Registered voters	339,614				
Sources
Footnotes: ^{1} Together for Extremadura–Raise Extremadura results are compared to the combined totals of Together for Extremadura, Raise Extremadura and Cáceres Alive in the 2023 election.; ^{2} A Worthy Extremadura–Sovereignty and Work results are compared to A Worthy Extremadura totals in the 2023 election.

=== 2023 ===
Summary of the 28 May 2023 Assembly of Extremadura election results in Cáceres
Parties and alliances	Popular vote			Seats	
Parties and alliances	Votes	%	±pp	Total	+/−
People's Party (PP)	92,789	40.13	+10.69	13	+3
Spanish Socialist Workers' Party (PSOE)	87,156	37.69	–6.26	12	–2
Vox (Vox)	19,501	8.43	+3.79	2	+2
United for Extremadura We Can–United Left–Green Alliance (Podemos–IU–AV)	14,119	6.11	–1.72	2	±0
Raise Extremadura (Levanta)^{1}	3,188	1.38	+0.35	0	±0
Together for Extremadura (JUEx)	3,183	1.38	New	0	±0
Cáceres Alive (Cáceres Viva)	2,117	0.92	New	0	±0
We Are Cáceres (Somos Cc)	1,975	0.85	New	0	±0
Citizens–Party of the Citizenry (CS)	1,925	0.83	–10.26	0	–3
Extremennist Party–Extremennists–Party of Extremadurans (PEx–EXT)	944	0.41	New	0	±0
A Worthy Extremadura (UED)	839	0.36	New	0	±0
For a Fairer World (PUM+J)	358	0.15	New	0	±0
Blank ballots	3,128	1.35	+0.43		
Total	231,222			29	±0
Valid votes	231,222	97.83	–0.74		
Invalid votes	5,123	2.17	+0.74		
Votes cast / turnout	236,345	69.68	–0.17		
Abstentions	102,849	30.32	+0.17		
Registered voters	339,194				
Sources
Footnotes: ^{1} Raise Extremadura results are compared to United Extremadura totals in the 2019 election.

=== 2019 ===
Summary of the 26 May 2019 Assembly of Extremadura election results in Cáceres
Parties and alliances	Popular vote			Seats	
Parties and alliances	Votes	%	±pp	Total	+/−
Spanish Socialist Workers' Party (PSOE)	104,370	43.95	+5.92	14	+2
People's Party (PP)	69,906	29.44	–8.71	10	–3
Citizens–Party of the Citizenry (Cs)	26,329	11.09	+6.00	3	+2
United for Extremadura (Podemos–IU–eXtremeños–Equo)^{1}	18,587	7.83	–7.31	2	–1
Vox (Vox)	11,012	4.64	+4.38	0	±0
United Extremadura (EU)	2,440	1.03	+0.19	0	±0
Animalist Party Against Mistreatment of Animals (PACMA)	1,552	0.65	+0.04	0	±0
Act (PACT)	646	0.27	New	0	±0
With You, We Are Democracy (Contigo)	441	0.19	New	0	±0
Blank ballots	2,184	0.92	–0.34		
Total	237,467			29	±0
Valid votes	237,467	98.57	+0.56		
Invalid votes	3,438	1.43	–0.56		
Votes cast / turnout	240,905	69.85	–2.40		
Abstentions	103,973	30.15	+2.40		
Registered voters	344,878				
Sources
Footnotes: ^{1} United for Extremadura results are compared to the combined totals of We Can, Let's Win Extremadura–United Left–The Greens, Extremadurans and Forward Extremadura in the 2015 election.

=== 2015 ===
Summary of the 24 May 2015 Assembly of Extremadura election results in Cáceres
Parties and alliances	Popular vote			Seats	
Parties and alliances	Votes	%	±pp	Total	+/−
People's Party (PP)	94,119	38.15	–9.79	13	–2
Spanish Socialist Workers' Party–Independent Socialists (PSOE–SIEx)	93,812	38.03	–3.38	12	–1
We Can (Podemos)	22,651	9.18	New	3	+3
Citizens–Party of the Citizenry (C's)^{1}	12,563	5.09	+4.24	1	+1
Let's Win Extremadura–United Left–The Greens (Ganemos–IU–LV)	8,414	3.41	–1.57	0	–1
Extremadurans (eXtremeños)^{2}	5,560	2.25	+2.05	0	±0
United Extremadura (EU)	2,064	0.84	New	0	±0
Animalist Party Against Mistreatment of Animals (PACMA)	1,502	0.61	New	0	±0
Union, Progress and Democracy (UPyD)	1,492	0.60	–0.57	0	±0
Forward Extremadura (AEx)^{3}	740	0.30	+0.10	0	±0
Vox (Vox)	647	0.26	New	0	±0
Blank ballots	3,115	1.26	–0.27		
Total	246,679			29	±0
Valid votes	246,679	98.01	–0.36		
Invalid votes	5,016	1.99	+0.36		
Votes cast / turnout	251,695	71.57	–3.01		
Abstentions	99,976	28.43	+3.01		
Registered voters	351,671				
Sources
Footnotes: ^{1} Citizens–Party of the Citizenry results are compared to Extremaduran People's Union totals in the 2011 election.; ^{2} Extremadurans results are compared to Convergence for Extremadura totals in the 2011 election.; ^{3} Forward Extremadura results are compared to For a Fairer World totals in the 2011 election.

=== 2011 ===
Summary of the 22 May 2011 Assembly of Extremadura election results in Cáceres
Parties and alliances	Popular vote			Seats	
Parties and alliances	Votes	%	±pp	Total	+/−
People's Party–United Extremadura (PP–EU)	123,472	47.94	+7.70	15	+2
Spanish Socialist Workers' Party–Regionalists (PSOE–regionalistas)	106,661	41.41	–10.34	13	–4
United Left–Independent Socialists of Extremadura (IU–SIEx)	12,826	4.98	+1.11	1	+1
Union, Progress and Democracy (UPyD)	3,006	1.17	New	0	±0
Extremaduran People's Union (UPEx)	2,185	0.85	+0.27	0	±0
Ecolo–The Greens (Ecolo–LV)^{1}	1,865	0.72	+0.06	0	±0
Independents for Extremadura (IPEx)	1,822	0.71	–0.41	0	±0
Citizens for Blank Votes (CenB)	774	0.30	+0.11	0	±0
Convergence for Extremadura (CEx)	519	0.20	New	0	±0
For a Fairer World (PUM+J)	510	0.20	New	0	±0
Blank ballots	3,942	1.53	+0.30		
Total	257,582			29	–1
Valid votes	257,582	98.37	–0.84		
Invalid votes	4,260	1.63	+0.84		
Votes cast / turnout	261,842	74.58	–1.02		
Abstentions	89,262	25.42	+1.02		
Registered voters	351,104				
Sources
Footnotes: ^{1} Ecolo–The Greens results are compared to The Greens of Extremadura totals in the 2007 election.

=== 2007 ===
Summary of the 27 May 2007 Assembly of Extremadura election results in Cáceres
Parties and alliances	Popular vote			Seats	
Parties and alliances	Votes	%	±pp	Total	+/−
Spanish Socialist Workers' Party–Regionalists (PSOE–regionalistas)	135,390	51.75	+2.94	17	+1
People's Party–United Extremadura (PP–EU)^{1}	105,283	40.24	–4.26	13	±0
United Left–Independent Socialists of Extremadura (IU–SIEx)	10,112	3.87	–1.43	0	–1
Independents for Extremadura (IPEx)	2,931	1.12	New	0	±0
The Greens of Extremadura (LV)	1,714	0.66	New	0	±0
Extremaduran People's Union (UPEx)	1,520	0.58	New	0	±0
Living Initiative (IH)	958	0.37	New	0	±0
Citizens for Blank Votes (CenB)	499	0.19	New	0	±0
Blank ballots	3,207	1.23	–0.16		
Total	261,614			30	±0
Valid votes	261,614	99.21	+0.09		
Invalid votes	2,070	0.79	–0.09		
Votes cast / turnout	263,684	75.60	–0.88		
Abstentions	85,110	24.40	+0.88		
Registered voters	348,794				
Sources
Footnotes: ^{1} People's Party–United Extremadura results are compared to the combined totals of the People's Party and United Extremadura in the 2003 election.

=== 2003 ===
Summary of the 25 May 2003 Assembly of Extremadura election results in Cáceres
Parties and alliances	Popular vote			Seats	
Parties and alliances	Votes	%	±pp	Total	+/−
Spanish Socialist Workers' Party–Progressives (PSOE–p)^{1}	127,779	48.81	+0.21	16	+1
People's Party (PP)	107,391	41.03	–0.20	13	±0
United Left–Independent Socialists of Extremadura (IU–SIEx)^{2}	13,871	5.30	+0.22	1	±0
United Extremadura (EU)	9,075	3.47	+0.17	0	±0
Blank ballots	3,649	1.39	+0.22		
Total	261,765			30	+1
Valid votes	261,765	99.12	–0.16		
Invalid votes	2,318	0.88	+0.16		
Votes cast / turnout	264,083	76.48	+3.64		
Abstentions	81,204	23.52	–3.64		
Registered voters	345,287				
Sources
Footnotes: ^{1} Spanish Socialist Workers' Party–Progressives results are compared to the combined totals of Spanish Socialist Workers' Party–Progressives and Extremaduran Coalition in the 1999 election.; ^{2} United Left–Independent Socialists of Extremadura results are compared to the combined totals of United Left–Commitment to Extremadura and Independent Socialists of Extremadura in the 1999 election.

=== 1999 ===
Summary of the 13 June 1999 Assembly of Extremadura election results in Cáceres
Parties and alliances	Popular vote			Seats	
Parties and alliances	Votes	%	±pp	Total	+/−
Spanish Socialist Workers' Party–Progressives (PSOE–p)	119,153	46.68	+3.53	15	+1
People's Party (PP)	105,225	41.23	+0.20	13	±0
United Left–Commitment to Extremadura (IU–CE)	11,263	4.41	–3.72	1	–1
United Extremadura (EU)	8,415	3.30	New	0	±0
Extremaduran Coalition (PREx–CREx)	4,907	1.92	–3.97	0	–1
Independent Socialists of Extremadura (SIEx)	1,708	0.67	–0.18	0	±0
The Greens of Extremadura (LV)	1,588	0.62	New	0	±0
Blank ballots	2,981	1.17	+0.23		
Total	255,240			29	–1
Valid votes	255,240	99.37	+0.05		
Invalid votes	1,626	0.63	–0.05		
Votes cast / turnout	256,866	72.84	–4.72		
Abstentions	95,793	27.16	+4.72		
Registered voters	352,659				

=== 1995 ===
Summary of the 28 May 1995 Assembly of Extremadura election results in Cáceres
Parties and alliances	Popular vote			Seats	
Parties and alliances	Votes	%	±pp	Total	+/−
Spanish Socialist Workers' Party (PSOE)	111,436	43.15	–7.78	14	–4
People's Party (PP)	105,956	41.03	+11.75	13	+3
United Left–The Greens–Commitment to Extremadura (IU–LV–CE)^{1}	20,994	8.13	+2.31	2	+1
Extremaduran Coalition (CEx)^{2}	15,218	5.89	–1.65	1	+1
Independent Socialists of Extremadura (SIEx)	2,203	0.85	New	0	±0
Democratic and Social Centre (CDS)	n/a	n/a	–5.45	0	–1
Blank ballots	2,436	0.94	+0.16		
Total	258,243			30	±0
Valid votes	258,243	99.32	–0.09		
Invalid votes	1,763	0.68	+0.09		
Votes cast / turnout	260,006	77.56	+6.46		
Abstentions	75,232	22.44	–6.46		
Registered voters	335,238				
Sources
Footnotes: ^{1} United Left–The Greens–Commitment to Extremadura results are compared to the combined totals of United Left and The Greens in the 1991 election.; ^{2} Extremaduran Coalition results are compared to the combined totals of United Extremadura and Extremaduran Regionalist Party in the 1991 election.

=== 1991 ===
Summary of the 26 May 1991 Assembly of Extremadura election results in Cáceres
Parties and alliances	Popular vote			Seats	
Parties and alliances	Votes	%	±pp	Total	+/−
Spanish Socialist Workers' Party (PSOE)	117,637	50.93	+5.86	18	+3
People's Party (PP)^{1}	67,641	29.28	+2.78	10	+2
Democratic and Social Centre (CDS)	12,593	5.45	–5.61	1	–2
United Left (IU)	11,012	4.77	+1.77	1	+1
United Extremadura (EU)	10,388	4.50	–7.69	0	–4
Extremaduran Regionalist Party (PREx)	7,016	3.04	New	0	±0
The Greens (LV)	2,421	1.05	New	0	±0
Communist Party of the Peoples of Spain (PCPE)	467	0.20	New	0	±0
Blank ballots	1,812	0.78	+0.01		
Total	230,987			30	±0
Valid votes	230,987	99.41	+0.33		
Invalid votes	1,360	0.59	–0.33		
Votes cast / turnout	232,347	71.10	–3.59		
Abstentions	94,429	28.90	+3.59		
Registered voters	326,776				
Sources
Footnotes: ^{1} People's Party results are compared to the combined totals of People's Alliance and People's Democratic Party in the 1987 election.

=== 1987 ===
Summary of the 10 June 1987 Assembly of Extremadura election results in Cáceres
Parties and alliances	Popular vote			Seats	
Parties and alliances	Votes	%	±pp	Total	+/−
Spanish Socialist Workers' Party (PSOE)	106,182	45.07	–2.45	15	±0
People's Alliance (AP)^{1}	58,567	24.86	n/a	8	–1
United Extremadura (EU)	28,725	12.19	–4.13	4	–1
Democratic and Social Centre (CDS)	26,052	11.06	+9.07	3	+3
United Left (IU)^{2}	7,057	3.00	–0.70	0	–1
Workers' Party of Spain–Communist Unity (PTE–UC)	2,735	1.16	New	0	±0
Liberal Party (PL)^{1}	2,286	0.97	n/a	0	±0
People's Democratic Party (PDP)^{1}	1,578	0.67	n/a	0	±0
Humanist Platform (PH)	619	0.26	New	0	±0
Blank ballots	1,818	0.77	+0.27		
Total	235,619			30	±0
Valid votes	235,619	99.08	–0.05		
Invalid votes	2,178	0.92	+0.05		
Votes cast / turnout	237,797	74.69	+3.07		
Abstentions	80,580	25.31	–3.07		
Registered voters	318,377				
Sources
Footnotes: ^{1} Within the People's Coalition alliance in the 1983 election.; ^{2} United Left results are compared to Communist Party of Spain totals in the 1983 election.

=== 1983 ===
Summary of the 8 May 1983 Assembly of Extremadura election results in Cáceres
Parties and alliances	Popular vote			Seats	
Parties and alliances	Votes	%	±pp	Total	+/−
Spanish Socialist Workers' Party (PSOE)	105,260	47.52	n/a	15	n/a
People's Coalition (AP–PDP–UL)	64,157	28.96	n/a	9	n/a
United Extremadura (EU)	36,153	16.32	n/a	5	n/a
Communist Party of Spain (PCE)	8,187	3.70	n/a	1	n/a
Democratic and Social Centre (CDS)	4,414	1.99	n/a	0	n/a
Extremaduran Popular Bloc (BPEx)	2,249	1.02	n/a	0	n/a
Blank ballots	1,110	0.50	n/a		
Total	221,530			30	n/a
Valid votes	221,530	99.13	n/a		
Invalid votes	1,934	0.87	n/a		
Votes cast / turnout	223,464	71.62	n/a		
Abstentions	88,568	28.38	n/a		
Registered voters	312,032				

== Bibliography ==
- Real Decreto-ley 20/1977, de 18 de marzo, sobre Normas Electorales (Royal Decree-Law 20/1977). Official State Gazette (in Spanish). 18 March 1977. BOE-A-1977-7445.
- Ley Orgánica 1/1983, de 25 de febrero, de Estatuto de Autonomía de Extremadura (Organic Law 1/1983). Official State Gazette (in Spanish). 25 February 1983. BOE-A-1983-6190.
- Decreto 5/1983, de 9 de marzo, por el que se convocan elecciones a la Asamblea de Extremadura (PDF) (Decree). Official Journal of Extremadura (in Spanish). 9 March 1983.
- Ley Orgánica 5/1985, de 19 de junio, del Régimen Electoral General (Organic Law 5/1985). Official State Gazette (in Spanish). 19 June 1985. BOE-A-1985-11672.
- Ley 2/1987, de 16 de marzo, de Elecciones a la Asamblea de Extremadura (Law 2/1987). Official State Gazette (in Spanish). 16 March 1987. BOE-A-1987-8817.
- Ley Orgánica 1/2011, de 28 de enero, de reforma del Estatuto de Autonomía de la Comunidad Autónoma de Extremadura (Organic Law 1/2011). Official State Gazette (in Spanish). 28 January 2011. BOE-A-2011-1638.
