= Badajoz (Assembly of Extremadura constituency) =

Coordinates: 38°40′N 6°10′W

- Assembly of Extremadura; Electoral constituency
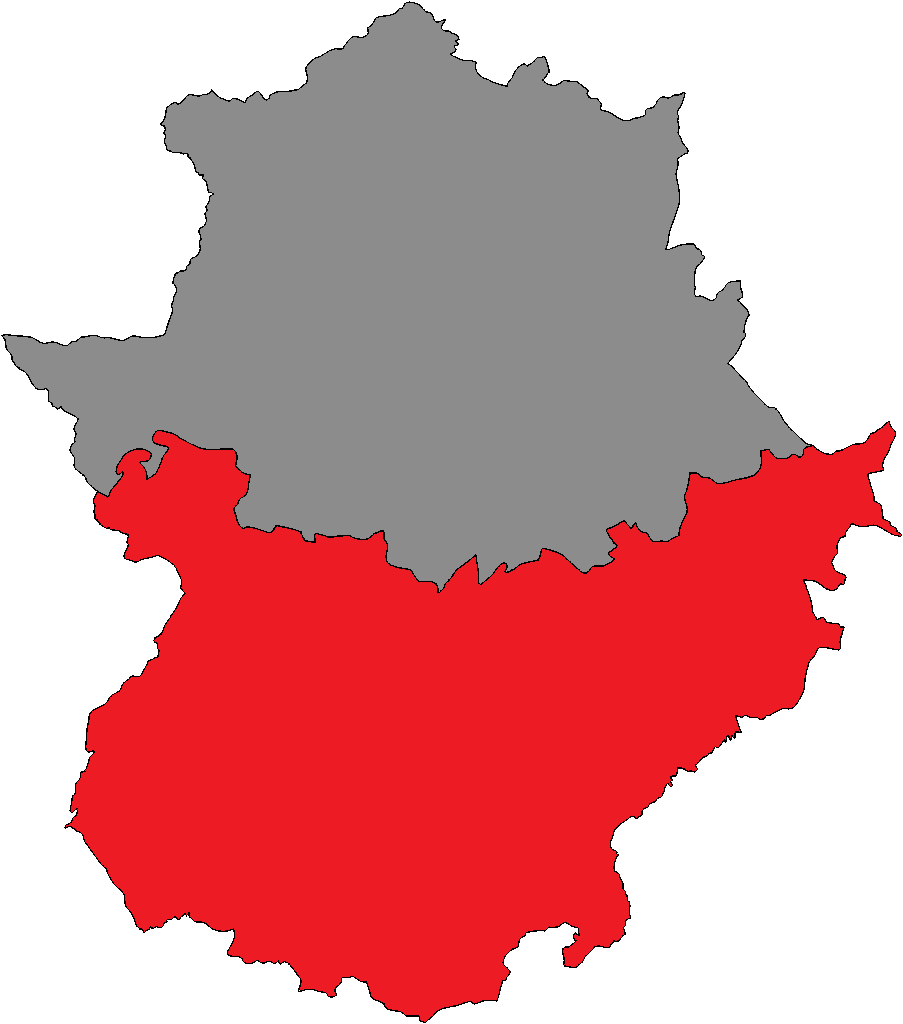
- Location of Badajoz within Extremadura
- Province: Badajoz
- Autonomous community: Extremadura
- Population: ▼663,886 (2025)
- Electorate: ▲551,424 (2025)
- Major settlements: Badajoz, Mérida, Don Benito, Almendralejo

Current constituency
- Created: 1983
- Seats: 35 (1983–1999); 36 (1999–2003); 35 (2003–2011); 36 (2011–present)
- Members: PP (16); PSOE (10); Vox (6); UxE (4)

Badajoz is one of the two constituencies (Spanish: circunscripciones) represented in the Assembly of Extremadura, the regional legislature of the Autonomous Community of Extremadura. The constituency currently elects 36 deputies. Its boundaries correspond to those of the Spanish province of Badajoz. The electoral system uses the D'Hondt method and a closed list proportional voting system, with an electoral threshold of five percent.

== Electoral system ==
The constituency was established under the Statute of Autonomy of Extremadura of 1983 and was first contested in the 1983 regional election. The Statute (reformed in 2011) provides for the two provinces in Extremadura—Badajoz and Cáceres—to be set as multi-member constituencies in the Assembly of Extremadura, each of which is assigned an initial minimum of 20 seats and the remaining ones are distributed in proportion to population. The exception was the 1983 election, when each constituency was allocated a fixed number of seats. Seats are elected using the D'Hondt method and closed-list proportional voting, with a five percent-threshold of valid votes (including blank ballots) in each constituency; alternatively, parties may also enter the seat distribution as long as they run candidates in both constituencies and reach five percent regionally. In 1983, the threshold was three percent in each constituency. The law does not provide for by-elections to fill vacant seats; instead, any vacancies arising after the proclamation of candidates and during the legislative term are filled by the next candidates on the party lists or, when required, by designated substitutes.

Voting is based on universal suffrage, comprising all Spanish nationals over 18 years of age, registered in the constituency and with full political rights. Amendments in 2011 required non-resident citizens to apply for voting, a system known as "begged" voting (Spanish: Voto rogado), which was abolished in 2022 and attributed responsibility for a major decrease in the turnout of Spaniards abroad during the years it was in force. Additionally, those legally incapacitated were also barred from voting before amendments in 2018 granted them the right to vote.

The electoral law allows for parties and federations registered in the interior ministry, alliances and groupings of electors to present lists of candidates. Parties and federations intending to form an alliance are required to inform the relevant electoral commission within 10 days of the election call—15 before 1985—whereas groupings of electors need to secure the signature of at least two percent of the electorate in the constituencies for which they seek election (before 1985 this was one permille, with a compulsory minimum of 500 signatures), disallowing electors from signing for more than one list. Amendments in 2007 required a balanced composition of men and women in the electoral lists, so that candidates of either sex made up at least 40 percent of the total composition; amendments in 2024 reinforced these through the use of a zipper system.

== Deputies ==
Deputies 1983–present
Key to parties PCE IU UpE Podemos PSOE CDS Cs EU PP CP AP Vox
Assembly	Election	Distribution
1st	1983	3 / 20 / 1 / 11
2nd	1987	2 / 19 / 5 / 9
3rd	1991	3 / 21 / 2 / 9
4th	1995	4 / 17 / 14
5th	1999	2 / 19 / 15
6th	2003	2 / 20 / 13
7th	2007	21 / 14
8th	2011	2 / 17 / 17
9th	2015	3 / 18 / 15
10th	2019	2 / 20 / 4 / 10
11th	2023	2 / 16 / 15 / 3
12th	2025	4 / 10 / 16 / 6

== Regional elections ==
=== 2025 ===
Summary of the 21 December 2025 Assembly of Extremadura election results in Badajoz
Parties and alliances	Popular vote			Seats	
Parties and alliances	Votes	%	±pp	Total	+/−
People's Party (PP)	140,811	42.63	+4.65	16	+1
Spanish Socialist Workers' Party (PSOE)	86,080	26.06	−15.18	10	−6
Vox (Vox)	56,898	17.22	+9.27	6	+3
United for Extremadura We Can–United Left–Green Alliance (Podemos–IU–AV)	34,240	10.36	+4.40	4	+2
Together for Extremadura–Raise Extremadura (Juntos–Levanta)^{1}	2,404	0.73	−2.91	0	±0
New Extremennism–Forward Extremadura (NEx)	1,921	0.58	New	0	±0
Animalist Party with the Environment (PACMA)	1,471	0.45	New	0	±0
Citizens–Party of the Citizenry (Cs)	924	0.28	−0.65	0	±0
A Worthy Extremadura–Sovereignty and Work (UED–SyT)^{2}	808	0.24	−0.14	0	±0
For a Fairer World (M+J)	639	0.19	−0.02	0	±0
Blank ballots	4,147	1.26	−0.21		
Total	330,343			35	±0
Valid votes	330,343	98.01	+0.27		
Invalid votes	6,694	1.99	−0.27		
Votes cast / turnout	337,037	61.12	−9.65		
Abstentions	214,387	38.88	+9.65		
Registered voters	551,424				
Sources
Footnotes: ^{1} Together for Extremadura–Raise Extremadura results are compared to the combined totals of Together for Extremadura and Raise Extremadura in the 2023 election.; ^{2} A Worthy Extremadura–Sovereignty and Work results are compared to A Worthy Extremadura totals in the 2023 election.

=== 2023 ===
Summary of the 28 May 2023 Assembly of Extremadura election results in Badajoz
Parties and alliances	Popular vote			Seats	
Parties and alliances	Votes	%	±pp	Total	+/−
Spanish Socialist Workers' Party (PSOE)	157,071	41.24	–7.30	16	–4
People's Party (PP)	144,595	37.96	+11.72	15	+5
Vox (Vox)	30,297	7.95	+3.19	3	+3
United for Extremadura We Can–United Left–Green Alliance (Podemos–IU–AV)	22,717	5.96	–0.85	2	±0
Together for Extremadura (JUEx)	12,376	3.25	New	0	±0
Citizens–Party of the Citizenry (CS)	3,538	0.93	–10.20	0	–4
Raise Extremadura (Levanta)^{1}	1,491	0.39	–0.02	0	±0
A Worthy Extremadura (UED)	1,450	0.38	New	0	±0
Extremennist Party–Extremennists–Party of Extremadurans (PEx–EXT)	948	0.25	New	0	±0
For a Fairer World (PUM+J)	798	0.21	+0.06	0	±0
Blank ballots	5,593	1.47	+0.56		
Total	380,874			36	±0
Valid votes	380,874	97.74	–1.00		
Invalid votes	8,814	2.26	+1.00		
Votes cast / turnout	389,688	70.77	+1.88		
Abstentions	160,954	29.23	–1.88		
Registered voters	550,642				
Sources
Footnotes: ^{1} Raise Extremadura results are compared to United Extremadura totals in the 2019 election.

=== 2019 ===
Summary of the 26 May 2019 Assembly of Extremadura election results in Badajoz
Parties and alliances	Popular vote			Seats	
Parties and alliances	Votes	%	±pp	Total	+/−
Spanish Socialist Workers' Party (PSOE)	183,249	48.54	+4.86	20	+2
People's Party (PP)	99,076	26.24	–10.03	10	–5
Citizens–Party of the Citizenry (Cs)	42,014	11.13	+7.19	4	+4
United for Extremadura (Podemos–IU–eXtremeños–Equo)^{1}	25,722	6.81	–6.41	2	–1
Vox (Vox)	17,980	4.76	+4.47	0	±0
Animalist Party Against Mistreatment of Animals (PACMA)	1,908	0.51	New	0	±0
United Extremadura (EU)	1,530	0.41	+0.14	0	±0
Public Defense Organization (ODP)	1,422	0.38	New	0	±0
Act (PACT)	665	0.18	New	0	±0
For a Fairer World (PUM+J)	555	0.15	New	0	±0
Blank ballots	3,427	0.91	–0.48		
Total	377,548			36	±0
Valid votes	377,548	98.74	+0.52		
Invalid votes	4,835	1.26	–0.52		
Votes cast / turnout	382,383	68.89	–2.40		
Abstentions	172,669	31.11	+2.40		
Registered voters	555,052				
Sources
Footnotes: ^{1} United for Extremadura results are compared to the combined totals of We Can, Let's Win Extremadura–United Left–The Greens, Extremadurans and Forward Extremadura in the 2015 election.

=== 2015 ===
Summary of the 24 May 2015 Assembly of Extremadura election results in Badajoz
Parties and alliances	Popular vote			Seats	
Parties and alliances	Votes	%	±pp	Total	+/−
Spanish Socialist Workers' Party–Independent Socialists (PSOE–SIEx)	171,203	43.68	–1.05	18	+1
People's Party (PP)	142,147	36.27	–8.73	15	–2
We Can (Podemos)	28,565	7.29	New	3	+3
Let's Win Extremadura–United Left–The Greens (Ganemos–IU–LV)	18,708	4.77	–1.41	0	–2
Citizens–Party of the Citizenry (C's)	15,447	3.94	New	0	±0
Extremadurans (eXtremeños)^{1}	3,745	0.96	+0.83	0	±0
Union, Progress and Democracy (UPyD)	2,455	0.63	–0.36	0	±0
Forward Badajoz (BA)	1,245	0.32	New	0	±0
Vox (Vox)	1,139	0.29	New	0	±0
United Extremadura (EU)	1,063	0.27	New	0	±0
Forward Extremadura (AEx)^{2}	798	0.20	–0.06	0	±0
Blank ballots	5,446	1.39	+0.06		
Total	391,961			36	±0
Valid votes	391,961	98.22	–0.60		
Invalid votes	7,118	1.78	+0.60		
Votes cast / turnout	399,079	71.29	–3.41		
Abstentions	160,683	28.71	+3.41		
Registered voters	559,762				
Sources
Footnotes: ^{1} Extremadurans results are compared to Convergence for Extremadura totals in the 2011 election.; ^{2} Forward Extremadura results are compared to For a Fairer World totals in the 2011 election.

=== 2011 ===
Summary of the 22 May 2011 Assembly of Extremadura election results in Badajoz
Parties and alliances	Popular vote			Seats	
Parties and alliances	Votes	%	±pp	Total	+/−
People's Party–United Extremadura (PP–EU)	184,503	45.00	+7.28	17	+3
Spanish Socialist Workers' Party–Regionalists (PSOE–regionalistas)	183,384	44.73	–9.07	17	–4
United Left–Independent Socialists of Extremadura (IU–SIEx)	25,331	6.18	+1.20	2	+2
Union, Progress and Democracy (UPyD)	4,052	0.99	New	0	±0
Independents for Extremadura (IPEx)	2,837	0.69	–0.66	0	±0
Ecolo–The Greens (Ecolo–LV)^{1}	2,022	0.49	–0.10	0	±0
For a Fairer World (PUM+J)	1,063	0.26	New	0	±0
Communist Party of the Peoples of Spain (PCPE)	836	0.20	–0.02	0	±0
Convergence for Extremadura (CEx)	537	0.13	New	0	±0
Blank ballots	5,452	1.33	+0.16		
Total	410,017			36	+1
Valid votes	410,017	98.82	–0.48		
Invalid votes	4,909	1.18	+0.48		
Votes cast / turnout	414,926	74.70	+0.16		
Abstentions	140,521	25.30	–0.16		
Registered voters	555,447				
Sources
Footnotes: ^{1} Ecolo–The Greens results are compared to The Greens of Extremadura totals in the 2007 election.

=== 2007 ===
Summary of the 27 May 2007 Assembly of Extremadura election results in Badajoz
Parties and alliances	Popular vote			Seats	
Parties and alliances	Votes	%	±pp	Total	+/−
Spanish Socialist Workers' Party–Regionalists (PSOE–regionalistas)	216,952	53.80	+0.27	21	+1
People's Party–United Extremadura (PP–EU)^{1}	152,109	37.72	–0.23	14	+1
United Left–Independent Socialists of Extremadura (IU–SIEx)	19,916	4.94	–1.97	0	–2
Independents for Extremadura (IPEx)	5,458	1.35	New	0	±0
The Greens of Extremadura (LV)	2,368	0.59	New	0	±0
Communist Party of the Peoples of Spain (PCPE)	903	0.22	New	0	±0
Democratic and Social Centre (CDS)	445	0.11	New	0	±0
Humanist Party (PH)	370	0.09	–0.18	0	±0
Blank ballots	4,719	1.17	–0.18		
Total	403,240			35	±0
Valid votes	403,240	99.30	+0.07		
Invalid votes	2,828	0.70	–0.07		
Votes cast / turnout	406,068	74.54	–0.54		
Abstentions	138,685	25.46	+0.54		
Registered voters	544,753				
Sources
Footnotes: ^{1} People's Party–United Extremadura results are compared to the combined totals of the People's Party and United Extremadura in the 2003 election.

=== 2003 ===
Summary of the 25 May 2003 Assembly of Extremadura election results in Badajoz
Parties and alliances	Popular vote			Seats	
Parties and alliances	Votes	%	±pp	Total	+/−
Spanish Socialist Workers' Party–Progressives (PSOE–p)^{1}	213,743	53.53	+3.23	20	+1
People's Party (PP)	148,417	37.17	–2.05	13	–2
United Left–Independent Socialists of Extremadura (IU–SIEx)^{2}	27,577	6.91	–1.37	2	±0
United Extremadura (EU)	3,096	0.78	+0.17	0	±0
Humanist Party (PH)	1,082	0.27	New	0	±0
Blank ballots	5,384	1.35	+0.22		
Total	399,299			35	–1
Valid votes	399,299	99.23	–0.16		
Invalid votes	3,086	0.77	+0.16		
Votes cast / turnout	402,385	75.08	+1.24		
Abstentions	133,556	24.92	–1.24		
Registered voters	535,941				
Sources
Footnotes: ^{1} Spanish Socialist Workers' Party–Progressives results are compared to the combined totals of Spanish Socialist Workers' Party–Progressives and Extremaduran Coalition in the 1999 election.; ^{2} United Left–Independent Socialists of Extremadura results are compared to the combined totals of United Left–Commitment to Extremadura and Independent Socialists of Extremadura in the 1999 election.

=== 1999 ===
Summary of the 13 June 1999 Assembly of Extremadura election results in Badajoz
Parties and alliances	Popular vote			Seats	
Parties and alliances	Votes	%	±pp	Total	+/−
Spanish Socialist Workers' Party–Progressives (PSOE–p)	194,264	49.65	+5.20	19	+2
People's Party (PP)	153,432	39.22	+0.77	15	+1
United Left–Commitment to Extremadura (IU–CE)	27,869	7.12	–4.98	2	–2
Independent Socialists of Extremadura (SIEx)	4,530	1.16	–0.22	0	±0
Extremaduran Coalition (PREx–CREx)	2,530	0.65	–1.84	0	±0
United Extremadura (EU)	2,368	0.61	New	0	±0
The Greens of Extremadura (LV)	1,822	0.47	New	0	±0
Blank ballots	4,427	1.13	+0.29		
Total	391,242			36	+1
Valid votes	391,242	99.39	+0.04		
Invalid votes	2,419	0.61	–0.04		
Votes cast / turnout	393,661	73.84	–4.99		
Abstentions	139,433	26.16	+4.99		
Registered voters	533,094				

=== 1995 ===
Summary of the 28 May 1995 Assembly of Extremadura election results in Badajoz
Parties and alliances	Popular vote			Seats	
Parties and alliances	Votes	%	±pp	Total	+/−
Spanish Socialist Workers' Party (PSOE)	177,713	44.45	–11.84	17	–4
People's Party (PP)	153,747	38.45	+13.32	14	+5
United Left–The Greens–Commitment to Extremadura (IU–LV–CE)^{1}	48,393	12.10	+2.41	4	+1
Extremaduran Coalition (CEx)^{2}	9,950	2.49	+0.84	0	±0
Independent Socialists of Extremadura (SIEx)	5,519	1.38	New	0	±0
Communist Party of the Peoples of Spain (PCPE)	1,136	0.28	–0.27	0	±0
Democratic and Social Centre (CDS)	n/a	n/a	–5.91	0	–2
Blank ballots	3,368	0.84	+0.07		
Total	399,826			35	±0
Valid votes	399,826	99.35	+0.06		
Invalid votes	2,612	0.65	–0.06		
Votes cast / turnout	402,438	78.83	+8.15		
Abstentions	108,052	21.17	–8.15		
Registered voters	510,490				
Sources
Footnotes: ^{1} United Left–The Greens–Commitment to Extremadura results are compared to the combined totals of United Left and The Greens in the 1991 election.; ^{2} Extremaduran Coalition results are compared to the combined totals of United Extremadura and Extremaduran Regionalist Party in the 1991 election.

=== 1991 ===
Summary of the 26 May 1991 Assembly of Extremadura election results in Badajoz
Parties and alliances	Popular vote			Seats	
Parties and alliances	Votes	%	±pp	Total	+/−
Spanish Socialist Workers' Party (PSOE)	196,747	56.29	+4.42	21	+2
People's Party (PP)^{1}	87,844	25.13	+0.36	9	±0
United Left (IU)	30,278	8.66	+1.67	3	+1
Democratic and Social Centre (CDS)	20,698	5.91	–7.28	2	–3
United Extremadura (EU)	4,115	1.18	–0.45	0	±0
The Greens (LV)	3,590	1.03	New	0	±0
Communist Party of the Peoples of Spain (PCPE)	1,912	0.55	New	0	±0
Extremaduran Regionalist Party (PREx)	1,644	0.47	New	0	±0
Blank ballots	2,696	0.77	–0.05		
Total	349,524			35	±0
Valid votes	349,524	99.29	+0.32		
Invalid votes	2,507	0.71	–0.32		
Votes cast / turnout	352,031	70.68	–3.52		
Abstentions	146,059	29.32	+3.52		
Registered voters	498,090				
Sources
Footnotes: ^{1} People's Party results are compared to the combined totals of People's Alliance and People's Democratic Party in the 1987 election.

=== 1987 ===
Summary of the 10 June 1987 Assembly of Extremadura election results in Badajoz
Parties and alliances	Popular vote			Seats	
Parties and alliances	Votes	%	±pp	Total	+/−
Spanish Socialist Workers' Party (PSOE)	186,753	51.87	–4.75	19	–1
People's Alliance (AP)^{1}	85,550	23.76	n/a	9	–2
Democratic and Social Centre (CDS)	47,502	13.19	New	5	+5
United Left (IU)^{2}	25,183	6.99	–1.31	2	–1
United Extremadura (EU)	5,881	1.63	–1.72	0	–1
People's Democratic Party (PDP)^{1}	3,625	1.01	n/a	0	±0
Workers' Party of Spain–Communist Unity (PTE–UC)	2,582	0.72	New	0	±0
Blank ballots	2,967	0.82	+0.37		
Total	360,043			35	±0
Valid votes	360,043	98.97	–0.09		
Invalid votes	3,757	1.03	+0.09		
Votes cast / turnout	363,800	74.20	+2.12		
Abstentions	126,477	25.80	–2.12		
Registered voters	490,277				
Sources
Footnotes: ^{1} Within the People's Coalition alliance in the 1983 election.; ^{2} United Left results are compared to Communist Party of Spain totals in the 1983 election.

=== 1983 ===
Summary of the 8 May 1983 Assembly of Extremadura election results in Badajoz
Parties and alliances	Popular vote			Seats	
Parties and alliances	Votes	%	±pp	Total	+/−
Spanish Socialist Workers' Party (PSOE)	191,679	56.62	n/a	20	n/a
People's Coalition (AP–PDP–UL)	104,449	30.85	n/a	11	n/a
Communist Party of Spain (PCE)	28,107	8.30	n/a	3	n/a
United Extremadura (EU)	11,351	3.35	n/a	1	n/a
Spanish Communist Workers' Party–Unified Communist Party (PCOE–PCEU)	1,463	0.43	n/a	0	n/a
Blank ballots	1,512	0.45	n/a		
Total	338,561			35	n/a
Valid votes	338,561	99.06	n/a		
Invalid votes	3,219	0.94	n/a		
Votes cast / turnout	341,780	72.08	n/a		
Abstentions	132,388	27.92	n/a		
Registered voters	474,168				

== Bibliography ==
- Real Decreto-ley 20/1977, de 18 de marzo, sobre Normas Electorales (Royal Decree-Law 20/1977). Official State Gazette (in Spanish). 18 March 1977. BOE-A-1977-7445.
- Ley Orgánica 1/1983, de 25 de febrero, de Estatuto de Autonomía de Extremadura (Organic Law 1/1983). Official State Gazette (in Spanish). 25 February 1983. BOE-A-1983-6190.
- Decreto 5/1983, de 9 de marzo, por el que se convocan elecciones a la Asamblea de Extremadura (PDF) (Decree). Official Journal of Extremadura (in Spanish). 9 March 1983.
- Ley Orgánica 5/1985, de 19 de junio, del Régimen Electoral General (Organic Law 5/1985). Official State Gazette (in Spanish). 19 June 1985. BOE-A-1985-11672.
- Ley 2/1987, de 16 de marzo, de Elecciones a la Asamblea de Extremadura (Law 2/1987). Official State Gazette (in Spanish). 16 March 1987. BOE-A-1987-8817.
- Ley Orgánica 1/2011, de 28 de enero, de reforma del Estatuto de Autonomía de la Comunidad Autónoma de Extremadura (Organic Law 1/2011). Official State Gazette (in Spanish). 28 January 2011. BOE-A-2011-1638.
