= 1999 Extremaduran regional election =

Election in the Spanish region of Extremadura

- 13 June 1999

All 65 seats in the Assembly of Extremadura 33 seats needed for a majority
- Opinion polls
- Registered: 885,753 ▲4.7%
- Turnout: 650,527 (73.4%) ▼4.9 pp
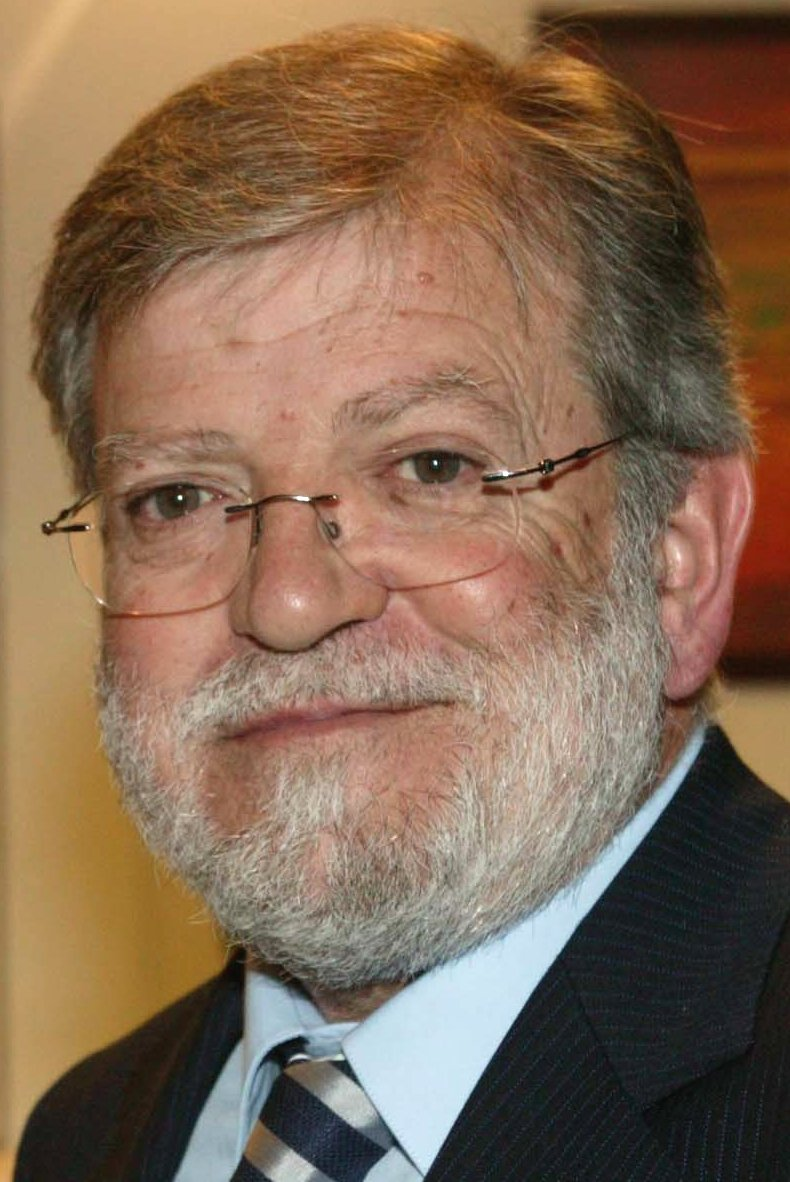

	First party	Second party	Third party
Leader	Juan Carlos Rodríguez Ibarra	Juan Ignacio Barrero	Manuel Cañada
Party	PSOE–p	PP	IU–CE
Leader since	20 December 1982	25 September 1993	1 October 1995
Leader's seat	Badajoz	Badajoz	Badajoz
Last election	31 seats, 43.9%	27 seats, 39.5%	6 seats, 10.5%
Seats won	34	28	3
Seat change	▲3	▲1	▼3
Popular vote	313,417	258,657	39,132
Percentage	48.5%	40.0%	6.1%
Swing	▲4.6 pp	▲0.5 pp	▼4.4 pp
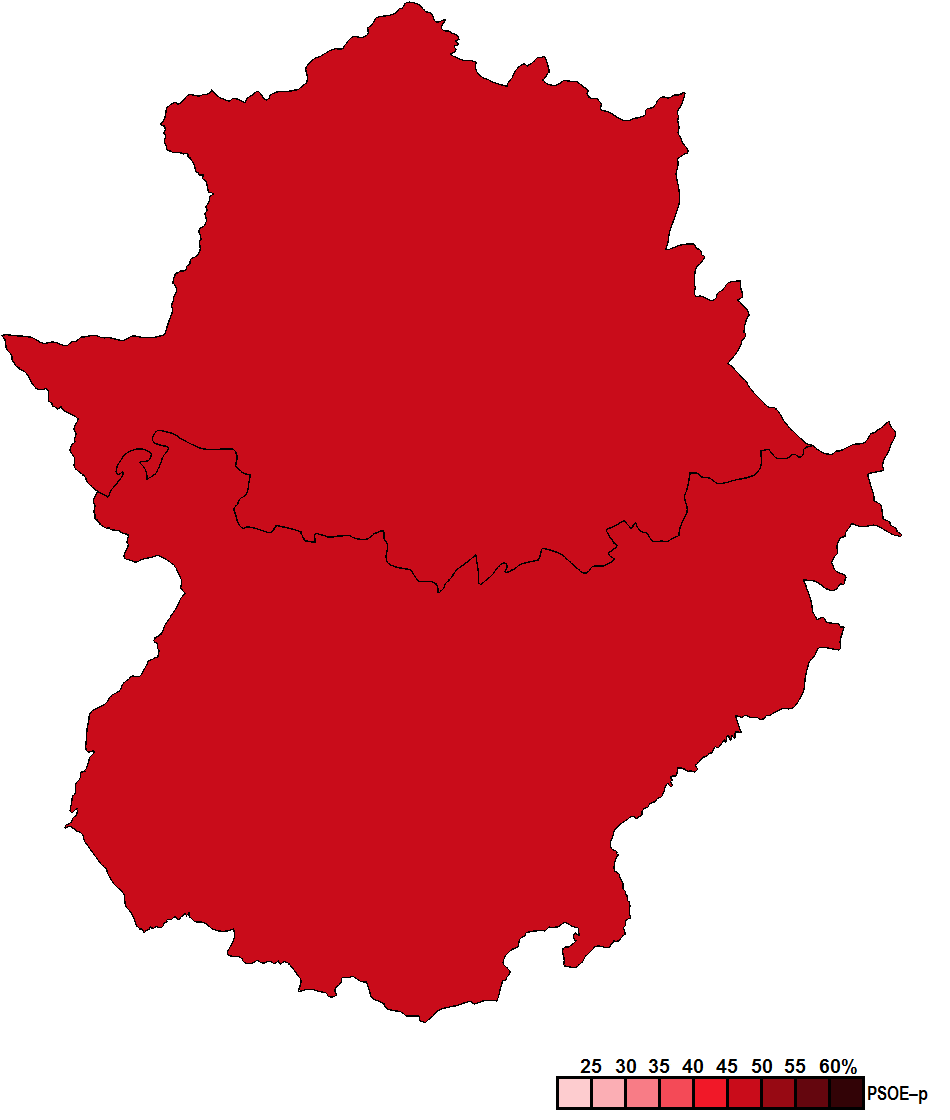
- Constituency results map for the Assembly of Extremadura
President before election
Juan Carlos Rodríguez Ibarra
PSOE
President after election
Juan Carlos Rodríguez Ibarra
PSOE

A regional election was held in Extremadura on 13 June 1999 to elect the 5th Assembly of the autonomous community. All 65 seats in the Assembly were up for election. It was held concurrently with regional elections in twelve other autonomous communities and local elections all across Spain, as well as the 1999 European Parliament election.

The Spanish Socialist Workers' Party (PSOE) won the election, obtaining 34 seats and 48.5% of the vote. This meant that the party recovered the absolute majority it had lost in the previous election. The opposition People's Party added 1 additional seat to their 27-seat count, but remained almost static in vote terms, gaining 0.5 percentage points albeit losing 1,000 votes from 1995. United Left (IU) lost half of its seats, while the Extremaduran Coalition (PREx–CREx) was left out of the Assembly after breaking up with United Extremadura (EU), which also failed to gain any seats.

The election resulted in Juan Carlos Rodríguez Ibarra being elected President for a fifth term in office.

== Overview ==
Under the 1983 Statute of Autonomy, the Assembly of Extremadura was the unicameral legislature of the homonymous autonomous community, having legislative power in devolved matters, as well as the ability to grant or withdraw confidence from a regional president. The electoral and procedural rules were supplemented by national law provisions.

=== Date ===
The term of the Assembly of Extremadura expired four years after the date of its previous ordinary election, with election day being fixed for the fourth Sunday of May every four years, but a 1998 amendment allowed for regional elections held in May 1995 to be held concurrently with European Parliament elections, provided that they were scheduled for within a four month-timespan. The election decree was required to be issued no later than 54 days before the scheduled election date and published on the following day in the Official Journal of Extremadura (DOE). The previous election was held on 28 May 1995, setting the date for election day concurrently with that year's European Parliament election on 13 June 1999.

Amendments earlier in 1999 granted the regional president the prerogative to dissolve the Assembly of Extremadura at any given time and call a snap election, provided that no motion of no confidence was in process, no nationwide election had been called and that dissolution did not occur either during the first legislative session or during the last year of parliament before its planned expiration, nor before one year after a previous one. In the event of an investiture process failing to elect a regional president within a two-month period from the first ballot, the Assembly was to be automatically dissolved and a fresh election called. Any snap election held as a result of these circumstances did not alter the date of the chamber's next ordinary election, with elected lawmakers serving the remainder of its original four-year term.

The election to the Assembly of Extremadura was officially called on 20 April 1999 with the publication of the corresponding decree in the DOE, setting election day for 13 June.

=== Electoral system ===
Voting for the Assembly was based on universal suffrage, comprising all Spanish nationals over 18 years of age, registered in Extremadura and with full political rights, provided that they had not been deprived of the right to vote by a final sentence, nor were legally incapacitated.

The Assembly of Extremadura had a maximum of 65 seats, with electoral provisions fixing its size at that number. All were elected in two multi-member constituencies—corresponding to the provinces of Badajoz and Cáceres, each of which was assigned an initial minimum of 20 seats and the remaining 25 distributed in proportion to population—using the D'Hondt method and closed-list proportional voting, with a five percent-threshold of valid votes (including blank ballots) in each constituency. Alternatively, parties could also enter the seat distribution as long as they ran candidates in both constituencies and reached five percent regionally.

As a result of the aforementioned allocation, each Assembly constituency was entitled the following seats:

Seats	Constituencies
36	Badajoz^{(+1)}
29	Cáceres^{(−1)}

The law did not provide for by-elections to fill vacant seats; instead, any vacancies arising after the proclamation of candidates and during the legislative term were filled by the next candidates on the party lists or, when required, by designated substitutes.

=== Outgoing parliament ===
The table below shows the composition of the parliamentary groups in the chamber at the time of the election call.

Parliamentary composition in April 1999
Groups	Parties	Legislators	
Groups	Parties	Seats	Total
Socialist Parliamentary Group	PSOE	31	31
People's Parliamentary Group	PP	26	26
Mixed Parliamentary Group	IU	4	8
Mixed Parliamentary Group	PDNI	2 (Note: Luciano Fernández and Juan Luis Aparicio, former IU legislators.)	8
Mixed Parliamentary Group	EU	1	8
Mixed Parliamentary Group	UCI	1 (Note: Eugenio Hornero, former PP legislator.)	8

== Parties and candidates ==
The electoral law allowed for parties and federations registered in the interior ministry, alliances and groupings of electors to present lists of candidates. Parties and federations intending to form an alliance were required to inform the relevant electoral commission within 10 days of the election call, whereas groupings of electors needed to secure the signature of at least two percent of the electorate in the constituencies for which they sought election, disallowing electors from signing for more than one list.

Below is a list of the main parties and alliances which contested the election:

Candidacy	Parties and alliances	Candidate	Ideology	Previous result		Gov.	Ref.
Candidacy	Parties and alliances	Candidate	Ideology	Vote %	Seats	Gov.	Ref.
PSOE–p	List: Spanish Socialist Workers' Party (PSOE); Democratic Party of the New Left (PDNI)	Juan Carlos Rodríguez Ibarra	Social democracy	43.9%	31	Yes	
PP	List: People's Party (PP)	Juan Ignacio Barrero	Conservatism; Christian democracy	39.5%	27	No	
IU–CE	List: United Left (IU) – Communist Party of Extremadura (PCEx) – Socialist Action Party (PASOC) – Republican Left (IR) – Revolutionary Workers' Party (POR) – Workers' Revolutionary Party (PRT)	Manuel Cañada	Socialism; Communism	10.5%	6	No	
PREx–CREx	List: Extremaduran Regionalist Party (PREx); Regionalist Convergence of Extremadura (CREx)	Estanislao Martín	Regionalism; Social democracy	3.8%	1	No	
EU	List: United Extremadura (EU)	Pedro Cañada	Regionalism; Conservatism	Contested in alliance (Note: EU (1 seat) contested the 1995 election in alliance with CEx.)		No	

== Opinion polls ==
The tables below list opinion polling results in reverse chronological order, showing the most recent first and using the dates when the survey fieldwork was done, as opposed to the date of publication. Where the fieldwork dates are unknown, the date of publication is given instead. The highest percentage figure in each polling survey is displayed with its background shaded in the leading party's colour. If a tie ensues, this is applied to the figures with the highest percentages. The "Lead" column on the right shows the percentage-point difference between the parties with the highest percentages in a poll.

=== Voting intention estimates ===
The table below lists weighted voting intention estimates. Refusals are generally excluded from the party vote percentages, while question wording and the treatment of "don't know" responses and those not intending to vote may vary between polling organisations. When available, seat projections determined by the polling organisations are displayed below (or in place of) the percentages in a smaller font; 33 seats were required for an absolute majority in the Assembly of Extremadura.

Polling firm/Commissioner	Fieldwork date	Sample size	Turnout	PSOE	PP	IU	PREx–CREx	EU	Lead
1999 regional election	13 Jun 1999	—N/a	73.4	48.5; 34	40.0; 28	6.1; 3	1.2; 0	1.7; 0	8.5
Eco Consulting/ABC	24 May–2 Jun 1999	?	?	42.3; 30/31	39.3; 28/29	11.2; 5/6	3.1; 0	1.8; 0	3.0
Demoscopia/El País	26 May–1 Jun 1999	?	74	47.6; 32	41.7; 28	8.5; 5	–	1.8; 0	5.9
Sigma Dos/El Mundo	20–26 May 1999	800	?	45.4; 30/32	41.6; 27/30	8.0; 5	2.8; 0/1	(Note: Within CEx.)	3.8
CIS	3–20 May 1999	898	76.0	45.8; 32/33	40.5; 27/28	9.3; 5	–	2.5; 0	5.3
1996 general election	3 Mar 1996	—N/a	82.3	48.4 (33)	40.3 (27)	8.9 (5)	1.0 (0)		8.1
1995 regional election	28 May 1995	—N/a	78.3	43.9; 31	39.5; 27	10.5; 6	3.8; 1		4.4

=== Voting preferences ===
The table below lists raw, unweighted voting preferences.

Polling firm/Commissioner	Fieldwork date	Sample size	PSOE	PP	IU	PREx–CREx	EU	Question	X mark	Lead
1999 regional election (Note: Does not include non-resident citizens.)	13 Jun 1999	—N/a	36.4	30.2	4.6	0.9	1.3	—N/a	24.4	6.2
CIS	3–20 May 1999	898	36.0	24.2	6.2	0.1	0.8	26.9	3.7	11.8
1996 general election	3 Mar 1996	—N/a	39.9	33.4	7.4	0.9		—N/a	17.0	6.5
1995 regional election	28 May 1995	—N/a	34.0	30.6	8.2	3.0		—N/a	21.1	3.4

=== Victory preferences ===
The table below lists opinion polling on the victory preferences for each party in the event of a regional election taking place.

Polling firm/Commissioner	Fieldwork date	Sample size	PSOE	PP	IU	PREx–CREx	EU	Other/ None	Question	Lead
CIS	3–20 May 1999	898	41.6	29.0	6.7	0.1	1.3	0.6	20.6	12.6

=== Victory likelihood ===
The table below lists opinion polling on the perceived likelihood of victory for each party in the event of a regional election taking place.

Polling firm/Commissioner	Fieldwork date	Sample size	PSOE	PP	IU	Other/ None	Question	Lead
CIS	3–20 May 1999	898	43.7	20.4	0.5	–	35.4	23.3

=== Preferred President ===
The table below lists opinion polling on leader preferences to become president of the Regional Government of Extremadura.

Polling firm/Commissioner	Fieldwork date	Sample size					Other/ None/ Not care	Question	Lead
Polling firm/Commissioner	Fieldwork date	Sample size	Ibarra PSOE	Barrero PP	M. Cañada IU	P. Cañada EU	Other/ None/ Not care	Question	Lead
CIS	3–20 May 1999	898	44.5	23.9	4.8	2.2	0.4	24.3	20.6

== Results ==
=== Overall ===
← Summary of the 13 June 1999 Assembly of Extremadura election results →
Parties and alliances	Popular vote			Seats	
Parties and alliances	Votes	%	±pp	Total	+/−
Spanish Socialist Workers' Party–Progressives (PSOE–p)	313,417	48.48	+4.54	34	+3
People's Party (PP)	258,657	40.01	+0.55	28	+1
United Left–Commitment to Extremadura (IU–CE)	39,132	6.05	−4.49	3	−3
United Extremadura (EU)	10,783	1.67	New	0	±0
Extremaduran Coalition (PREx–CREx)	7,437	1.15	−2.67	0	−1
Independent Socialists of Extremadura (SIEx)	6,238	0.96	−0.21	0	±0
The Greens of Extremadura (LV)	3,410	0.53	New	0	±0
Blank ballots	7,408	1.15	+0.27		
Total	646,482			65	±0
Valid votes	646,482	99.38	+0.04		
Invalid votes	4,045	0.62	−0.04		
Votes cast / turnout	650,527	73.44	−4.89		
Abstentions	235,226	26.56	+4.89		
Registered voters	885,753				

Popular vote
PSOE–p	48.48%
PP	40.01%
IU–CE	6.05%
EU	1.67%
PREx–CREx	1.15%
Others	1.49%
Blank ballots	1.15%

Seats
PSOE–p	52.31%
PP	43.08%
IU–CE	4.62%

=== Distribution by constituency ===
Constituency	PSOE–p		PP		IU–CE	
Constituency	%	S	%	S	%	S
Badajoz	49.7	19	39.2	15	7.1	2
Cáceres	46.7	15	41.2	13	4.4	1
Total	48.5	34	40.0	28	6.1	3

== Aftermath ==
=== Government formation ===
Investiture; Nomination of Juan Carlos Rodríguez Ibarra (PSOE)
Ballot →	15 July 1999
Required majority →	33 out of 65
Yes: • PSOE–p (34)	34 / 65
No: • PP (27); • IU (3)	30 / 65
Abstentions	0 / 65
Absentees: • PP (1)	1 / 65

== Bibliography ==
- Ley Orgánica 1/1983, de 25 de febrero, de Estatuto de Autonomía de Extremadura (Organic Law 1/1983). Official State Gazette (in Spanish). 25 February 1983 [version as of 7 May 1999]. BOE-A-1983-6190.
- Ley 2/1984, de 7 de junio, del Gobierno y de la Administración de la Comunidad Autónoma de Extremadura (Law 2/1984). Official State Gazette (in Spanish). 7 June 1984. BOE-A-1984-17656.
- Ley Orgánica 5/1985, de 19 de junio, del Régimen Electoral General (Organic Law 5/1985). Official State Gazette (in Spanish). 19 June 1985 [version as of 22 April 1999]. BOE-A-1985-11672.
- Ley 2/1987, de 16 de marzo, de Elecciones a la Asamblea de Extremadura (Law 2/1987). Official State Gazette (in Spanish). 16 March 1987 [version as of 26 March 1991]. BOE-A-1987-8817.
- Decreto del Presidente 2/1999, de 19 de abril, por el que se convocan elecciones a la Asamblea de Extremadura (PDF) (Decree 2/1999). Official Journal of Extremadura (in Spanish). 19 April 1999.
