= 2015 Extremaduran regional election =

Election in the Spanish region of Extremadura

- 24 May 2015

All 65 seats in the Assembly of Extremadura 33 seats needed for a majority
- Opinion polls
- Registered: 911,433 ▲0.5%
- Turnout: 650,774 (71.4%) ▼3.3 pp
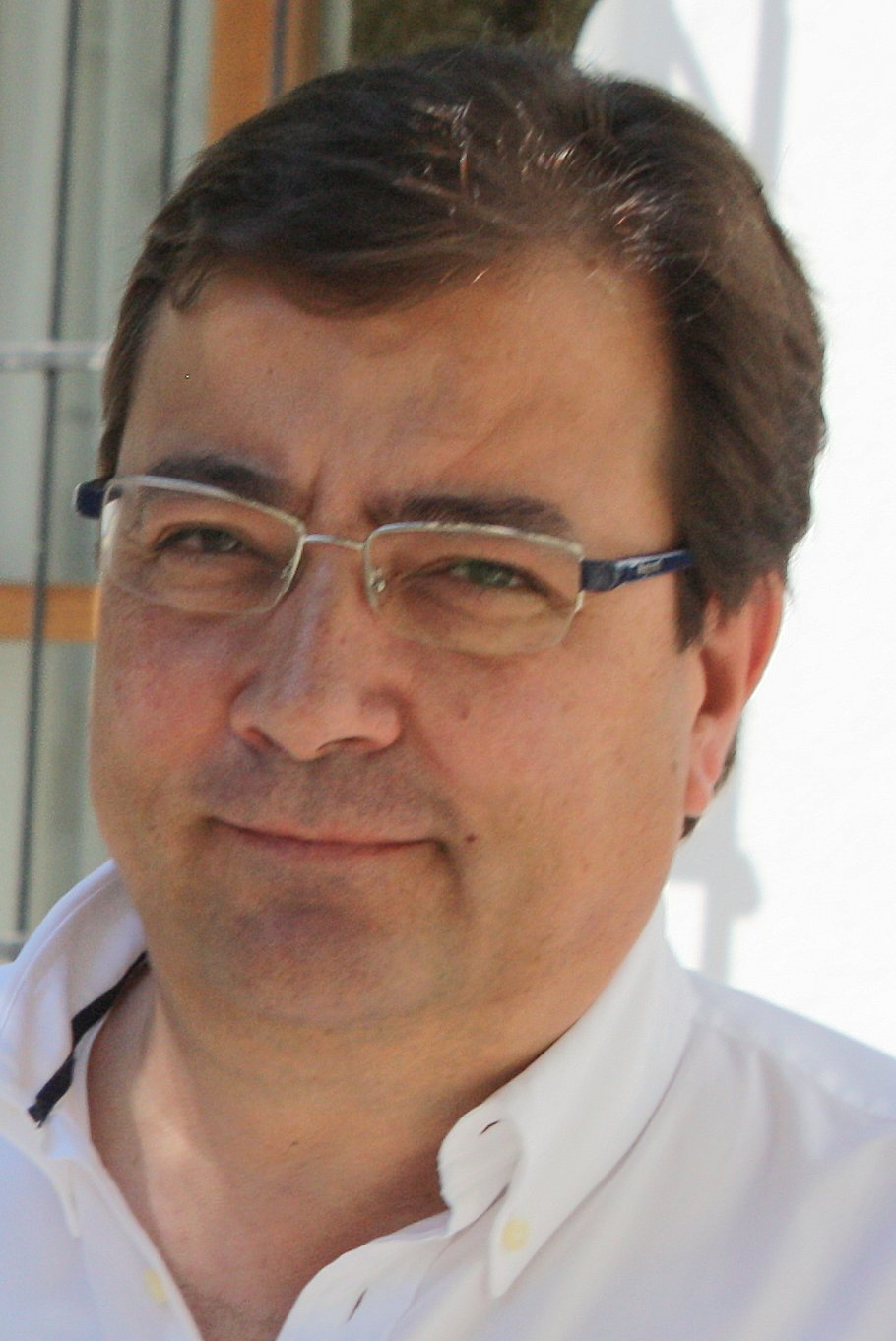

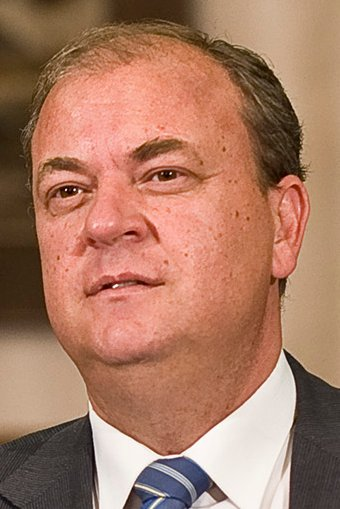

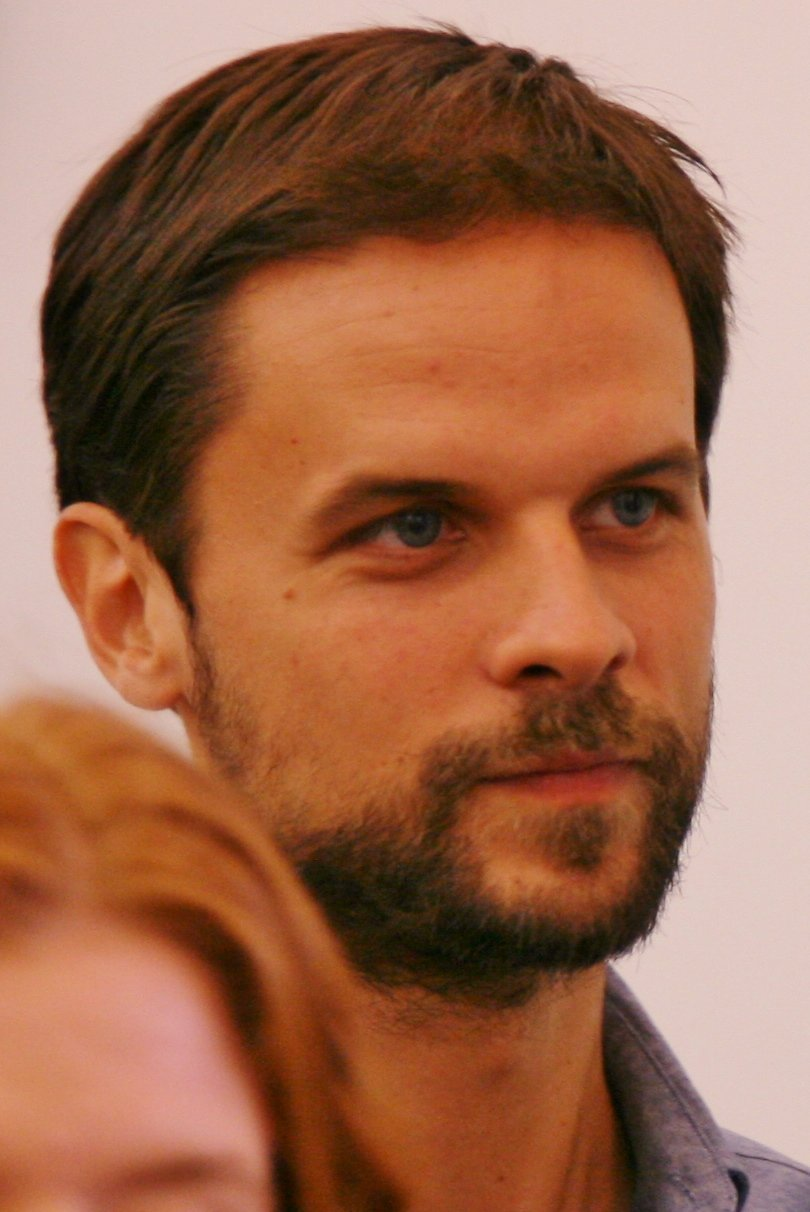

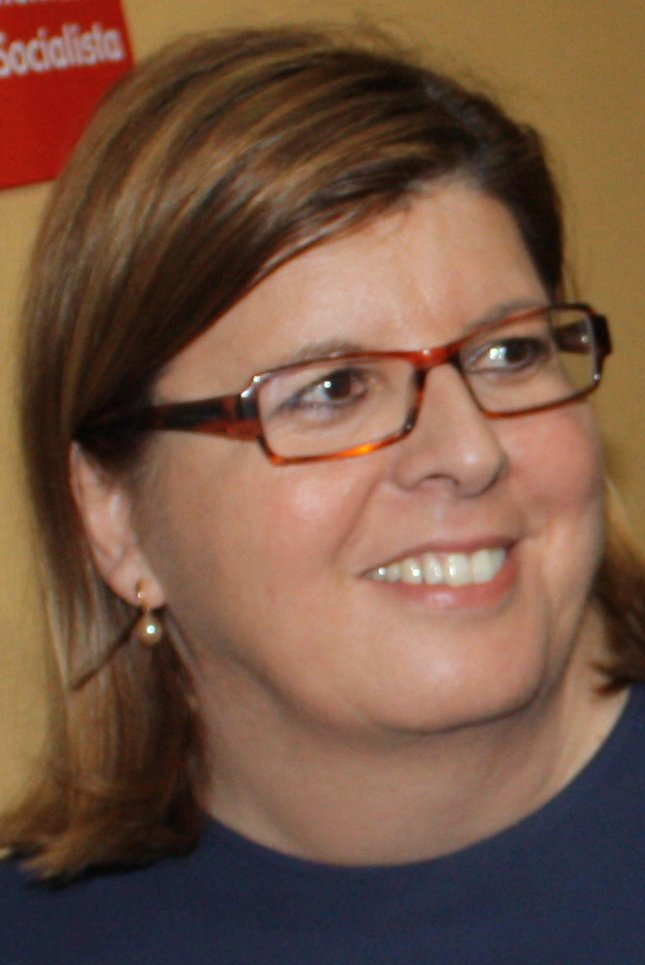

	First party	Second party	Third party
Leader	Guillermo Fernández Vara	José Antonio Monago	Álvaro Jaén
Party	PSOE–SIEx	PP	Podemos
Leader since	20 September 2006	8 November 2008	14 February 2015
Leader's seat	Badajoz	Badajoz	Cáceres
Last election	30 seats, 43.4%	32 seats, 46.1%	Did not contest
Seats won	30	28	6
Seat change	0	▼4	▲6
Popular vote	265,015	236,266	51,216
Percentage	41.5%	37.0%	8.0%
Swing	▼1.9 pp	▼9.1 pp	New party
	Fourth party	Fifth party
Leader	Victoria Domínguez	Pedro Escobar
Party	C's	IU
Leader since	5 April 2015	30 September 2007
Leader's seat	Cáceres	Badajoz (lost)
Last election	0 seats, 0.3% (Note: Results for UPEx in the 2011 election.)	3 seats, 5.7%
Seats won	1	0
Seat change	▲1	▼3
Popular vote	28,010	27,122
Percentage	4.4%	4.2%
Swing	▲4.1 pp	▼1.5 pp
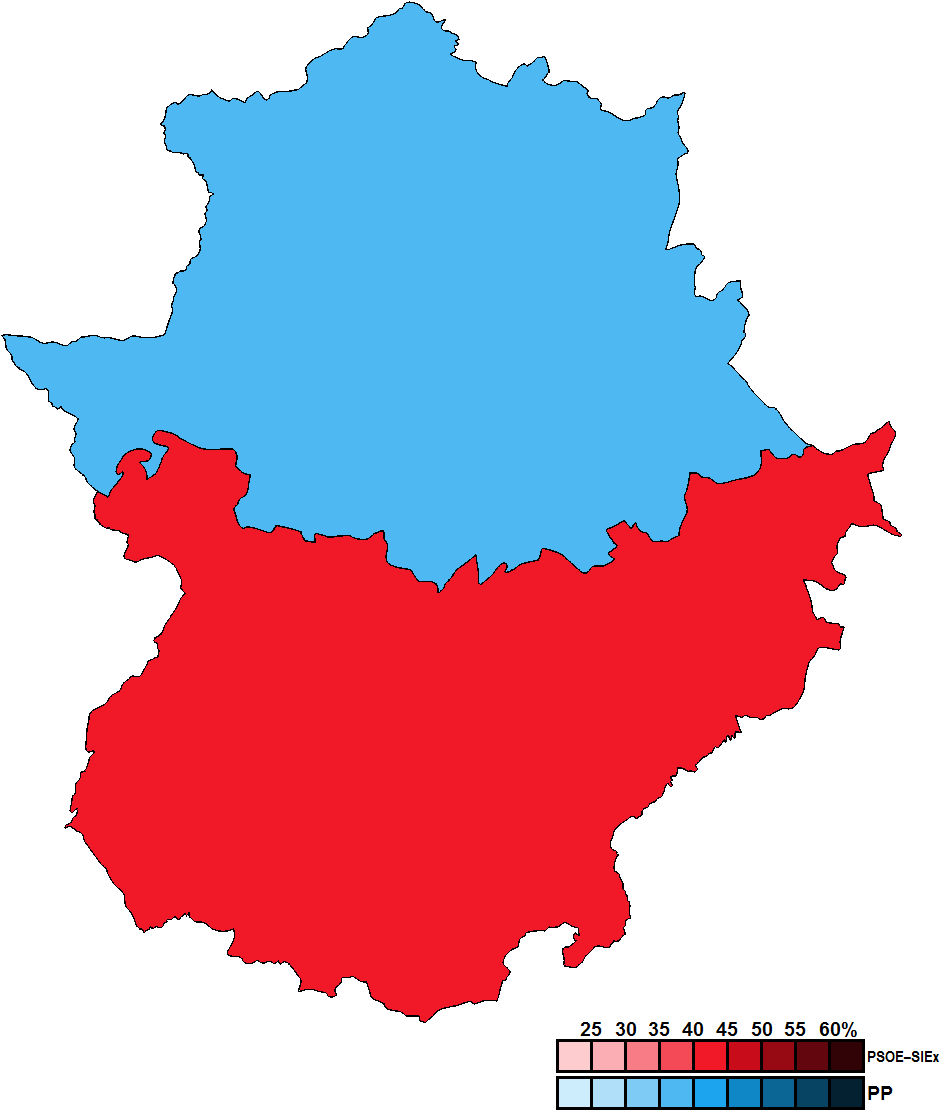
- Constituency results map for the Assembly of Extremadura
President before election
José Antonio Monago
PP
President after election
Guillermo Fernández Vara
PSOE

A regional election was held in Extremadura on 24 May 2015 to elect the 9th Assembly of the autonomous community. All 65 seats in the Assembly were up for election. It was held concurrently with regional elections in twelve other autonomous communities and local elections all across Spain.

== Overview ==
Under the 2011 Statute of Autonomy, the Assembly of Extremadura was the unicameral legislature of the homonymous autonomous community, having legislative power in devolved matters, as well as the ability to grant or withdraw confidence from a regional president. The electoral and procedural rules were supplemented by national law provisions.

=== Date ===
The term of the Assembly of Extremadura expired four years after the date of its previous election, unless it was dissolved earlier. The election decree was required to be issued no later than 25 days before the scheduled expiration date of parliament and published on the following day in the Official Journal of Extremadura (DOE), with election day taking place 54 days after the decree's publication. The previous election was held on 22 May 2011, which meant that the chamber's term would have expired on 22 May 2015. The election decree was required to be published in the DOE no later than 28 April 2015, setting the latest possible date for election day on 21 June 2015.

The regional president had the prerogative to dissolve the Assembly of Extremadura at any given time and call a snap election, provided that no motion of no confidence was in process and that dissolution did not occur before one year after a previous one. In the event of an investiture process failing to elect a regional president within a two-month period from the first ballot, the Assembly was to be automatically dissolved and a fresh election called.

The election to the Assembly of Extremadura was officially called on 31 March 2015 with the publication of the corresponding decree in the DOE, setting election day for 24 May.

=== Electoral system ===
Voting for the Assembly was based on universal suffrage, comprising all Spanish nationals over 18 years of age, registered in Extremadura and with full political rights, provided that they had not been deprived of the right to vote by a final sentence, nor were legally incapacitated. Additionally, non-resident citizens were required to apply for voting, a system known as "begged" voting (Spanish: Voto rogado).

The Assembly of Extremadura had a maximum of 65 seats, with electoral provisions fixing its size at that number. All were elected in two multi-member constituencies—corresponding to the provinces of Badajoz and Cáceres, each of which was assigned an initial minimum of 20 seats and the remaining 25 distributed in proportion to population—using the D'Hondt method and closed-list proportional voting, with a five percent-threshold of valid votes (including blank ballots) in each constituency. Alternatively, parties could also enter the seat distribution as long as they ran candidates in both constituencies and reached five percent regionally.

As a result of the aforementioned allocation, each Assembly constituency was entitled the following seats:

Seats	Constituencies
36	Badajoz
29	Cáceres

The law did not provide for by-elections to fill vacant seats; instead, any vacancies arising after the proclamation of candidates and during the legislative term were filled by the next candidates on the party lists or, when required, by designated substitutes.

=== Outgoing parliament ===
The table below shows the composition of the parliamentary groups in the chamber at the time of the election call.

Parliamentary composition in March 2015
Groups	Parties	Legislators	
Groups	Parties	Seats	Total
People's–United Extremadura Parliamentary Group	PP	31	32
People's–United Extremadura Parliamentary Group	EU	1	32
Socialist Parliamentary Group	PSOE	28	28
United Left–Greens Parliamentary Group	IU	3	3
Mixed Parliamentary Group	PREx–CREx	2	2

== Parties and candidates ==
The electoral law allowed for parties and federations registered in the interior ministry, alliances and groupings of electors to present lists of candidates. Parties and federations intending to form an alliance were required to inform the relevant electoral commission within 10 days of the election call, whereas groupings of electors needed to secure the signature of at least two percent of the electorate in the constituencies for which they sought election, disallowing electors from signing for more than one list. Additionally, a balanced composition of men and women was required in the electoral lists, so that candidates of either sex made up at least 40 percent of the total composition.

Below is a list of the main parties and alliances which contested the election:

Candidacy	Parties and alliances	Candidate	Ideology	Previous result		Gov.	Ref.
Candidacy	Parties and alliances	Candidate	Ideology	Vote %	Seats	Gov.	Ref.
PP	List: People's Party (PP)	José Antonio Monago	Conservatism; Christian democracy	46.1%	32	Yes	
PSOE–SIEx	List: Spanish Socialist Workers' Party (PSOE); Independent Socialists of Extremadura (SIEx)	Guillermo Fernández Vara	Social democracy	43.4%	30	No	
Ganemos– IU–LV	List: United Left (IU) – Communist Party of Extremadura (PCEx) – The Dawn Marxist Organization (La Aurora (OM)) – Republican Left (IR) – Open Left (IzAb); The Greens (LV)	Pedro Escobar	Socialism; Communism	5.7%	3	No	
UPyD	List: Union, Progress and Democracy (UPyD)	José Francisco Sigüenza	Social liberalism Radical centrism	1.1%	0	No	
C's	List: Citizens–Party of the Citizenry (C's)	Victoria Domínguez	Liberalism	0.3%	0	No	
eX	List: Extremadurans (eX) – Extremaduran Regionalist Party (PREx) – Regionalist Convergence of Extremadura (CREx)	Estanislao Martín	Regionalism; Social democracy	Contested in alliance (Note: PREx–CREx (2 seats) contested the 2011 election in alliance with the PSOE.)		No	
EU	List: United Extremadura (EU)	José María Gijón	Regionalism; Conservatism	Contested in alliance (Note: EU (1 seat) contested the 2011 election in alliance with the PP.)		No	
Podemos	List: We Can (Podemos); Equo (Equo)	Álvaro Jaén	Left-wing populism Direct democracy Democratic socialism	Did not contest		No	

United Extremadura (EU) broke its electoral alliance with the People's Party (PP) in July 2014, arguing that it had received an offer from the PP that "undervalued them as a party" by not offering them the removal of the 5% electoral threshold, "nor relevant positions".

== Campaign ==
=== Debates ===
2015 Extremaduran regional election debates
Date	Organizer(s)	Moderator(s)	P Present (Note: Denotes a main invitee attending the event.) S Surrogate (Note: Denotes a main invitee not attending the event, sending a surrogate in their place.) NI Not invited I Invited A Absent invitee													
Date	Organizer(s)	Moderator(s)	PP	PSOE	G–IU–LV	eX	EU	UPyD	C's	Podemos	Vox	AEx	PACMA	BA	Audience	Ref.
18 May	Canal Extremadura	Víctor Molino	P Monago	P Vara	P Escobar	P Martín	P Gijón	P Sigüenza	P Domínguez	P Jaén	P Hernández	P Ibarlucea	P Rodríguez	P Manzano	—	

== Opinion polls ==
The tables below list opinion polling results in reverse chronological order, showing the most recent first and using the dates when the survey fieldwork was done, as opposed to the date of publication. Where the fieldwork dates are unknown, the date of publication is given instead. The highest percentage figure in each polling survey is displayed with its background shaded in the leading party's colour. If a tie ensues, this is applied to the figures with the highest percentages. The "Lead" column on the right shows the percentage-point difference between the parties with the highest percentages in a poll.

=== Voting intention estimates ===
The table below lists weighted voting intention estimates. Refusals are generally excluded from the party vote percentages, while question wording and the treatment of "don't know" responses and those not intending to vote may vary between polling organisations. When available, seat projections determined by the polling organisations are displayed below (or in place of) the percentages in a smaller font; 33 seats were required for an absolute majority in the Assembly of Extremadura.

Color key:

Poll conducted after legal ban on opinion polls

Polling firm/Commissioner	Fieldwork date	Sample size	Turnout	PP	PSOE	IU	UPyD	eX	Podemos	C's	Lead
2015 regional election	24 May 2015	—N/a	71.4	37.0; 28	41.5; 30	4.2; 0	0.6; 0	1.5; 0	8.0; 6	4.4; 1	4.5
GAD3/Antena 3	11–22 May 2015	?	?	? 27/29	? 26/27	? 0	–	–	? 4/5	? 5/6	?
NC Report/La Razón	17 May 2015	500	?	35.7; 25/26	37.6; 27/28	4.0; 0	0.8; 0	–	10.1; 6/7	9.5; 5/6	1.9
PP	4–8 May 2015	3,500	?	41.1; 30	30.3; 21	4.1; 0	1.0; 0	–	10.0; 7	10.6; 7	10.8
Enquest/El Periódico	28–30 Apr 2015	?	75.5	41.0; 29/30	30.7; 21/22	4.2; 0	0.7; 0	0.6; 0	12.1; 7/8	9.9; 6	10.3
GAD3/ABC	22–24 Apr 2015	501	?	37.9; 26/27	33.9; 24/25	3.8; 0	1.1; 0	–	8.3; 6	10.5; 7/8	4.0
Metroscopia/El País	21–22 Apr 2015	1,000	?	37.4; 25	31.8; 22	5.4; 3	–	–	13.0; 8	10.5; 7	5.6
CIS	23 Mar–19 Apr 2015	1,199	?	34.6; 24/26	38.9; 26/28	4.1; 0/2	0.7; 0	–	11.6; 8	6.9; 4	4.3
Vaubán/Extremadura 7 Días	30 Mar–15 Apr 2015	14,073	79.1	33.3; 24/25	34.8; 26/27	4.3; 0/2	3.9; 0/1	2.1; 0	10.7; 7/8	8.1; 6/7	1.5
PSOE	9 Apr 2015	?	?	? 26	? 29	–	–	–	? 7	? 3	?
NC Report/La Razón	25 Mar–9 Apr 2015	500	?	36.2; 26/27	38.2; 27/28	4.1; 0	0.9; 0	–	9.1; 5/6	9.2; 5/6	2.0
Sigma Dos/Canal Extremadura (Note: "Estudio de Opinión ante las Elecciones Autonómicas en Extremadura". Canal Extremadura (in Spanish). 9 March 2015. Archived from the original on 2 April 2015.)	24–27 Feb 2015	1,300	?	43.8; 31/33	29.2; 21/23	4.4; 0/2	–	–	13.4; 9	4.4; 0/2	14.6
Vaubán/Extremadura 7 Días (Note: "Encuesta sobre las elecciones autonómicas en Extremadura - Febrero 2015". Extremadura 7 Días (in Spanish). 26 February 2015. Archived from the original on 26 February 2015.)	9–20 Feb 2015	1,067	?	32.6; 24	33.4; 24	5.1; 3	7.6; 5	2.1; 0	12.7; 9	3.2; 0	0.8
PP	31 Jan 2015	?	?	? 32	? 25	? 3	–	–	? 5	–	?
Sigma Dos/Hoy (Note: "El PP, a solo dos escaños de la mayoría absoluta". Hoy (in Spanish). 18 January 2015. Archived from the original on 20 January 2015.)	8–12 Jan 2015	800	?	43.0; 29/31	33.3; 23/24	5.8; 3	–	–	12.4; 8/9	–	9.7
Llorente & Cuenca	31 Oct 2014	?	?	? 23/26	? 26/29	? 3/5	? 2	–	? 4/7	–	?
Vaubán/Extremadura 7 Días (Note: "Encuesta Electoral, intención de voto actual de los extremeños". Extremadura 7 Días (in Spanish). 21 October 2014. Archived from the original on 7 December 2014.)	21 Oct 2014	376	?	33.0; 26	35.0; 27	4.5; 0	7.5; 5	–	9.5; 7	–	2.0
Sigma Dos/Hoy	16–20 Oct 2014	800	?	39.7; 27/29	38.2; 27/29	3.6; 0	–	–	13.5; 9	–	1.5
2014 EP election	25 May 2014	—N/a	44.1	35.6 (27)	38.7 (29)	6.3 (4)	5.5 (3)	0.5 (0)	4.8 (2)	1.0 (0)	3.1
Sigma Dos/Hoy	23–27 Jan 2014	800	?	44.3; 31/32	38.9; 27/28	9.5; 6	3.6; 0	–	–	–	5.4
NC Report/La Razón	15 Oct–12 Nov 2013	?	?	? 30/31	? 30/31	? 4/5	–	–	–	–	?
NC Report/La Razón	15 Apr–10 May 2013	250	?	39.1; 29/30	43.2; 31/32	? 4/5	–	(Note: Within PSOE.)	–	–	4.1
Sigma Dos/Hoy	29 Apr–3 May 2013	800	?	45.1; 31/33	39.1; 27/29	8.5; 5	2.7; 0		–	–	6.0
2011 general election	20 Nov 2011	—N/a	73.9	51.2 (37)	37.2 (25)	5.7 (3)	3.5 (0)		–	–	14.0
2011 regional election	22 May 2011	—N/a	74.7	46.1; 32	43.4; 30	5.7; 3	1.1; 0		–	–	2.7

=== Voting preferences ===
The table below lists raw, unweighted voting preferences.

Polling firm/Commissioner	Fieldwork date	Sample size	PP	PSOE	IU	UPyD	Podemos	C's	Question	X mark	Lead
2015 regional election (Note: Does not include non-resident citizens.)	24 May 2015	—N/a	26.7	29.9	3.1	0.4	5.8	3.1	—N/a	26.6	3.2
CIS	23 Mar–19 Apr 2015	1,199	21.2	26.4	2.7	0.4	9.6	4.8	25.7	6.6	5.2
2014 EP election	25 May 2014	—N/a	15.7	17.1	2.8	2.4	2.1	0.4	—N/a	54.8	1.4
2011 general election	20 Nov 2011	—N/a	38.2	27.7	4.2	2.6	–	–	—N/a	24.4	10.5
2011 regional election	22 May 2011	—N/a	34.7	32.7	4.2	0.8	–	–	—N/a	23.8	2.0

=== Victory preferences ===
The table below lists opinion polling on the victory preferences for each party in the event of a regional election taking place.

Polling firm/Commissioner	Fieldwork date	Sample size	PP	PSOE	IU	UPyD	Podemos	C's	Other/ None	Question	Lead
CIS	23 Mar–19 Apr 2015	1,199	25.4	34.4	3.2	0.8	11.0	5.5	4.7	14.9	9.0

=== Victory likelihood ===
The table below lists opinion polling on the perceived likelihood of victory for each party in the event of a regional election taking place.

Polling firm/Commissioner	Fieldwork date	Sample size	PP	PSOE	Podemos	Other/ None	Question	Lead
CIS	23 Mar–19 Apr 2015	1,199	44.8	24.8	1.3	1.1	28.0	20.0

=== Preferred President ===
The table below lists opinion polling on leader preferences to become president of the Regional Government of Extremadura.

Polling firm/Commissioner	Fieldwork date	Sample size							Other/ None/ Not care	Question	Lead
Polling firm/Commissioner	Fieldwork date	Sample size	Monago PP	Vara PSOE	Escobar IU	Sigüenza UPyD	Jaén Podemos	Domínguez C's	Other/ None/ Not care	Question	Lead
GAD3/ABC	22–24 Apr 2015	501	29.2	18.5	1.6	0.3	3.5	5.2	21.0	20.7	10.7
CIS (Note: Responses denoting a party's generic candidate are aggregated to that party's main candidate/leader at the time of the poll.)	23 Mar–19 Apr 2015	1,199	29.1	34.4	4.1	0.8	7.9	3.8	0.2	19.8	4.3

== Results ==
=== Overall ===
← Summary of the 24 May 2015 Assembly of Extremadura election results →
Parties and alliances	Popular vote			Seats	
Parties and alliances	Votes	%	±pp	Total	+/−
Spanish Socialist Workers' Party–Independent Socialists (PSOE–SIEx)	265,015	41.50	−1.95	30	±0
People's Party (PP)	236,266	37.00	−9.13	28	−4
We Can (Podemos)	51,216	8.02	New	6	+6
Citizens–Party of the Citizenry (C's)^{1}	28,010	4.39	+4.06	1	+1
Let's Win Extremadura–United Left–The Greens (Ganemos–IU–LV)	27,122	4.25	−1.47	0	−3
Extremadurans (eXtremeños)^{2}	9,305	1.46	+1.30	0	±0
Union, Progress and Democracy (UPyD)	3,947	0.62	−0.44	0	±0
United Extremadura (EU)	3,127	0.49	New	0	±0
Vox (Vox)	1,786	0.28	New	0	±0
Forward Extremadura (AEx)^{3}	1,538	0.24	±0.00	0	±0
Animalist Party Against Mistreatment of Animals (PACMA)	1,502	0.24	New	0	±0
Forward Badajoz (BA)	1,245	0.19	New	0	±0
Blank ballots	8,561	1.34	−0.07		
Total	638,640			65	±0
Valid votes	638,640	98.14	−0.51		
Invalid votes	12,134	1.86	+0.51		
Votes cast / turnout	650,774	71.40	−3.25		
Abstentions	260,659	28.60	+3.25		
Registered voters	911,433				
Sources
Footnotes: ^{1} Citizens–Party of the Citizenry results are compared to Extremaduran People's Union totals in the 2011 election.; ^{2} Extremadurans results are compared to Convergence for Extremadura totals in the 2011 election.; ^{3} Forward Extremadura results are compared to For a Fairer World totals in the 2011 election.

Popular vote
PSOE–SIEx	41.50%
PP	37.00%
Podemos	8.02%
C's	4.39%
Ganemos–IU–LV	4.25%
eX	1.46%
Others	2.06%
Blank ballots	1.34%

Seats
PSOE–SIEx	46.15%
PP	43.08%
Podemos	9.23%
C's	1.54%

=== Distribution by constituency ===
Constituency	PSOE		PP		Podemos		C's	
Constituency	%	S	%	S	%	S	%	S
Badajoz	43.7	18	36.3	15	7.3	3	3.9	−
Cáceres	38.0	12	38.2	13	9.2	3	5.1	1
Total	41.5	30	37.0	28	8.0	6	4.4	1

== Aftermath ==
=== Government formation ===
Investiture; Nomination of Guillermo Fernández Vara (PSOE)
Ballot →	1 July 2015
Required majority →	33 out of 65
Yes: • PSOE–SIEx (30); • Podemos (6)	36 / 65
No	0 / 65
Abstentions: • PP (28); • C's (1)	29 / 65
Absentees	0 / 65

== Bibliography ==
- Ley Orgánica 5/1985, de 19 de junio, del Régimen Electoral General (Organic Law 5/1985). Official State Gazette (in Spanish). 19 June 1985 [version as of 31 March 2015]. BOE-A-1985-11672.
- Ley 2/1987, de 16 de marzo, de Elecciones a la Asamblea de Extremadura (Law 2/1987). Official State Gazette (in Spanish). 16 March 1987 [version as of 26 March 1991]. BOE-A-1987-8817.
- Ley 1/2002, de 28 de febrero, del Gobierno y de la Administración de la Comunidad Autónoma de Extremadura (Law 1/2002). Official State Gazette (in Spanish). 28 February 2002 [version as of 10 April 2015]. BOE-A-2002-7297.
- Ley Orgánica 1/2011, de 28 de enero, de reforma del Estatuto de Autonomía de la Comunidad Autónoma de Extremadura (Organic Law 1/2011). Official State Gazette (in Spanish). 28 January 2011 [version as of 29 January 2011]. BOE-A-2011-1638.
- Decreto del Presidente 5/2015, de 30 de marzo, por el que se convocan elecciones a la Asamblea de Extremadura (PDF) (Decree 5/2015). Official Journal of Extremadura (in Spanish). 30 March 2015. 2015030005.
