= 1995 Extremaduran regional election =

Election in the Spanish region of Extremadura

- 28 May 1995

All 65 seats in the Assembly of Extremadura 33 seats needed for a majority
- Opinion polls
- Registered: 845,728 ▲2.5%
- Turnout: 662,444 (78.3%) ▲7.5 pp
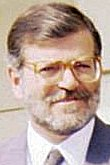

	First party	Second party	Third party
Leader	Juan Carlos Rodríguez Ibarra	Juan Ignacio Barrero	Ricardo Sosa
Party	PSOE	PP	IU–LV–CE
Leader since	20 December 1982	25 September 1993	1993
Leader's seat	Badajoz	Badajoz	Badajoz
Last election	39 seats, 54.2%	19 seats, 26.8%	4 seats, 8.1% (Note: Results for IU (7.1%, 4 seats) and LV (1.0%, 0 seats) in the 1991 election.)
Seats won	31	27	6
Seat change	▼8	▲8	▲2
Popular vote	289,149	259,703	69,387
Percentage	43.9%	39.5%	10.5%
Swing	▼10.3 pp	▲12.7 pp	▲2.4 pp
	Fourth party
Leader	Pedro Cañada
Party	CEx
Leader since	10 December 1980
Leader's seat	Cáceres
Last election	0 seats, 4.0% (Note: Results for EU (2.5%, 0 seats) and PREx (1.5%, 0 seats) in the 1991 election.)
Seats won	1
Seat change	▲1
Popular vote	14,452
Percentage	3.8%
Swing	▼0.2 pp
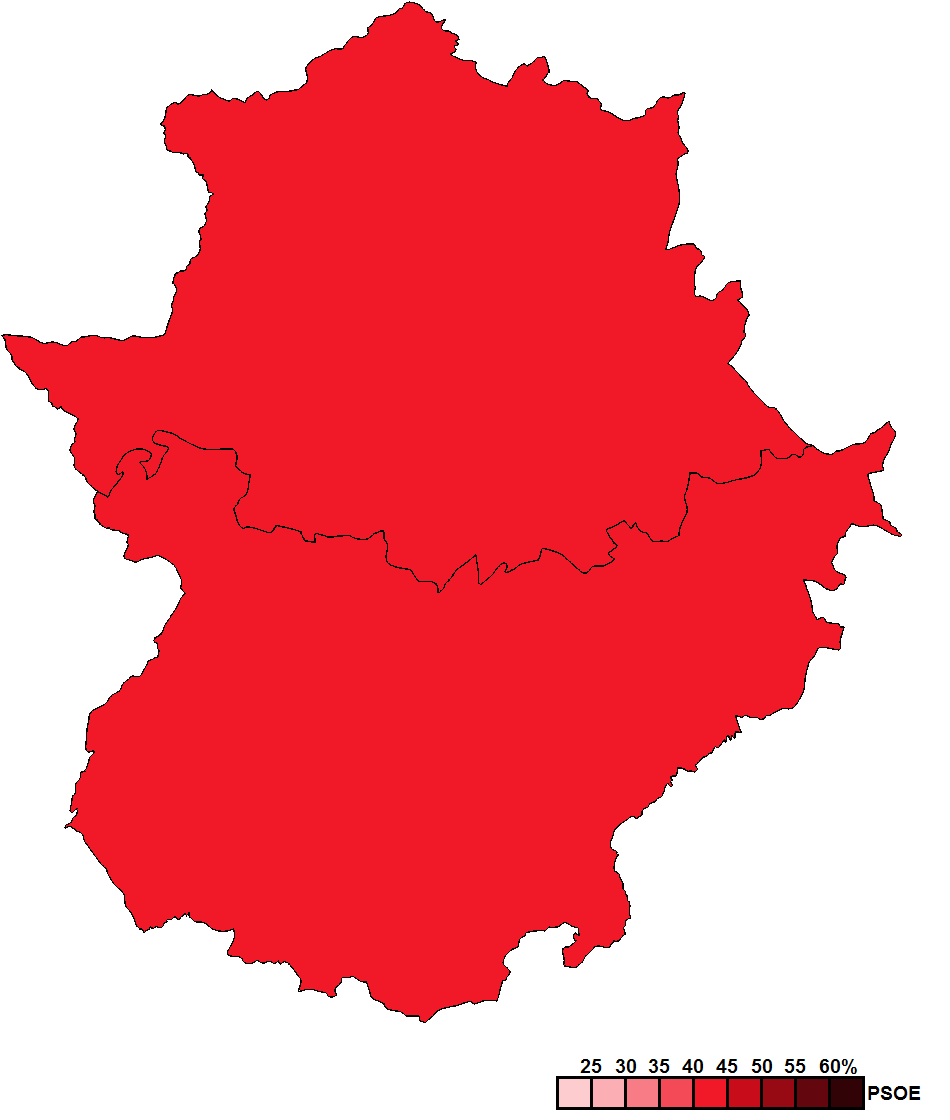
- Constituency results map for the Assembly of Extremadura
President before election
Juan Carlos Rodríguez Ibarra
PSOE
President after election
Juan Carlos Rodríguez Ibarra
PSOE

A regional election was held in Extremadura on 28 May 1995 to elect the 4th Assembly of the autonomous community. All 65 seats in the Assembly were up for election. It was held concurrently with regional elections in twelve other autonomous communities and local elections all across Spain.

The Spanish Socialist Workers' Party (PSOE) won the election, but suffered a spectacular fall in both vote share and seats, losing the absolute majority it had maintained since 1983. On the other hand, the People's Party (PP) made great gains, winning the same 8 seats lost by the PSOE and nearing 40% of the vote. United Left (IU) obtained its best historical result to date in a regional election, with 6 out of 65 seats. The Extremaduran Coalition, an alliance of the Regionalist Convergence of Extremadura (CREx), the Extremaduran Regionalist Party (PREx) and United Extremadura (EU), the latter two having failed to enter the Assembly in the 1991 election, entered the Assembly with 1 seat.

The Democratic and Social Centre (CDS), which had already been reduced to 3 seats in 1991, did not even stand in the 1995 election, thus losing all of its seats.

Juan Carlos Rodríguez Ibarra was able to be re-elected for a fourth term in office thanks to the abstention of IU. Both PP and IU together commanded an absolute majority of seats and could potentially block the PSOE in the Assembly, as had happened in Andalusia.

== Overview ==
Under the 1983 Statute of Autonomy, the Assembly of Extremadura was the unicameral legislature of the homonymous autonomous community, having legislative power in devolved matters, as well as the ability to grant or withdraw confidence from a regional president. The electoral and procedural rules were supplemented by national law provisions.

=== Date ===
The term of the Assembly of Extremadura expired four years after the date of its previous ordinary election, with election day being fixed for the fourth Sunday of May every four years. The election decree was required to be issued no later than 54 days before the scheduled election date and published on the following day in the Official Journal of Extremadura (DOE). The previous election was held on 26 May 1991, setting the date for election day on the fourth Sunday of May four years later, which was 28 May 1995.

The Assembly of Extremadura could not be dissolved before the expiration date of parliament, except in the event of an investiture process failing to elect a regional president within a two-month period from the first ballot. In such a case, the Assembly was to be automatically dissolved and a snap election called, with elected lawmakers serving the remainder of its original four-year term.

The election to the Assembly of Extremadura was officially called on 4 April 1995 with the publication of the corresponding decree in the DOE, setting election day for 28 May.

=== Electoral system ===
Voting for the Assembly was based on universal suffrage, comprising all Spanish nationals over 18 years of age, registered in Extremadura and with full political rights, provided that they had not been deprived of the right to vote by a final sentence, nor were legally incapacitated.

The Assembly of Extremadura had a maximum of 65 seats, with electoral provisions fixing its size at that number. All were elected in two multi-member constituencies—corresponding to the provinces of Badajoz and Cáceres, each of which was assigned an initial minimum of 20 seats and the remaining 25 distributed in proportion to population—using the D'Hondt method and closed-list proportional voting, with a five percent-threshold of valid votes (including blank ballots) in each constituency. Alternatively, parties could also enter the seat distribution as long as they ran candidates in both constituencies and reached five percent regionally.

As a result of the aforementioned allocation, each Assembly constituency was entitled the following seats:

Seats	Constituencies
35	Badajoz
30	Cáceres

The law did not provide for by-elections to fill vacant seats; instead, any vacancies arising after the proclamation of candidates and during the legislative term were filled by the next candidates on the party lists or, when required, by designated substitutes.

=== Outgoing parliament ===
The table below shows the composition of the parliamentary groups in the chamber at the time of the election call.

Parliamentary composition in April 1995
Groups	Parties	Legislators	
Groups	Parties	Seats	Total
Socialist Parliamentary Group	PSOE	39	39
People's Parliamentary Group	PP	19	19
Mixed Parliamentary Group	IU	4	7
Mixed Parliamentary Group	CDS	3	7

== Parties and candidates ==
The electoral law allowed for parties and federations registered in the interior ministry, alliances and groupings of electors to present lists of candidates. Parties and federations intending to form an alliance were required to inform the relevant electoral commission within 10 days of the election call, whereas groupings of electors needed to secure the signature of at least two percent of the electorate in the constituencies for which they sought election, disallowing electors from signing for more than one list.

Below is a list of the main parties and alliances which contested the election:

Candidacy	Parties and alliances	Candidate	Ideology	Previous result		Gov.	Ref.
Candidacy	Parties and alliances	Candidate	Ideology	Vote %	Seats	Gov.	Ref.
PSOE	List: Spanish Socialist Workers' Party (PSOE)	Juan Carlos Rodríguez Ibarra	Social democracy	54.2%	39	Yes	
PP	List: People's Party (PP)	Juan Ignacio Barrero	Conservatism; Christian democracy	26.8%	19	No	
IU–LV–CE	List: United Left (IU) – Communist Party of Extremadura (PCEx) – Socialist Action Party (PASOC) – Republican Left (IR); The Greens (LV)	Ricardo Sosa	Socialism; Communism	8.1%	4	No	
CEx	List: United Extremadura (EU); Extremaduran Regionalist Party (PREx); Regionalist Convergence of Extremadura (CREx)	Pedro Cañada	Regionalism	4.0%	0	No	
Not contesting
CDS	List: Democratic and Social Centre (CDS)	Tomás Martín Tamayo	Centrism; Liberalism	5.7%	3	No	

== Opinion polls ==
The tables below list opinion polling results in reverse chronological order, showing the most recent first and using the dates when the survey fieldwork was done, as opposed to the date of publication. Where the fieldwork dates are unknown, the date of publication is given instead. The highest percentage figure in each polling survey is displayed with its background shaded in the leading party's colour. If a tie ensues, this is applied to the figures with the highest percentages. The "Lead" column on the right shows the percentage-point difference between the parties with the highest percentages in a poll.

=== Voting intention estimates ===
The table below lists weighted voting intention estimates. Refusals are generally excluded from the party vote percentages, while question wording and the treatment of "don't know" responses and those not intending to vote may vary between polling organisations. When available, seat projections determined by the polling organisations are displayed below (or in place of) the percentages in a smaller font; 33 seats were required for an absolute majority in the Assembly of Extremadura.

Color key:

Exit poll

Polling firm/Commissioner	Fieldwork date	Sample size	Turnout	PSOE	PP	IU	CDS	CEx	Lead
1995 regional election	28 May 1995	—N/a	78.3	43.9; 31	39.5; 27	10.5; 6	–	3.8; 1	4.4
Eco Consulting/RTVE	28 May 1995	?	?	42.3; 28/30	41.2; 28/30	10.9; 6/8	–	–	1.1
Sigma Dos/COPE	28 May 1995	?	?	39.7; 27/29	42.2; 29/31	12.0; 7	–	–	2.5
Vox Pública–ODEC/Antena 3	28 May 1995	?	?	? 29/30	? 29/30	? 5/7	–	–	Tie
CEPS/Hoy	21 May 1995	?	?	? 26	? 28	? 9	–	? 2	?
Demoscopia/El País	10–15 May 1995	600	?	42.8; 29/31	40.5; 28	10.9; 6/8	–	2.1; 0	2.3
CIS	24 Apr–10 May 1995	1,198	70.8	45.6	41.3	9.3	–	2.3	4.3
Sigma Dos/PP	20–30 Jan 1995	1,000	?	39.7; 26/29	40.4; 26/30	13.8; 8/9	–	2.9; 1	0.7
1994 EP election	12 Jun 1994	—N/a	66.2	45.0 (31)	40.2 (28)	10.7 (6)	0.7 (0)	1.0 (0)	4.8
1993 general election	6 Jun 1993	—N/a	80.5	51.5 (35)	35.8 (25)	7.8 (5)	2.0 (0)	1.0 (0)	15.7
1991 regional election	26 May 1991	—N/a	70.8	54.2; 39	26.8; 19	7.1; 4	5.7; 3	2.5; 0	27.4

=== Voting preferences ===
The table below lists raw, unweighted voting preferences.

Polling firm/Commissioner	Fieldwork date	Sample size	PSOE	PP	IU	CDS	CEx	Question	X mark	Lead
1995 regional election (Note: Does not include non-resident citizens.)	28 May 1995	—N/a	34.0	30.6	8.2	–	3.0	—N/a	21.1	3.4
CIS	24 Apr–10 May 1995	1,198	41.0	25.3	5.2	0.3	1.9	20.6	4.0	15.7
CIS	2–17 Mar 1995	1,196	35.2	21.3	10.7	0.9	2.7	22.2	4.6	13.9
1994 EP election	12 Jun 1994	—N/a	29.8	26.8	7.1	0.5	0.6	—N/a	33.4	3.0
1993 general election	6 Jun 1993	—N/a	41.4	28.9	6.3	1.6	0.8	—N/a	19.1	12.5
CIS	13–21 Nov 1992	1,058	31.5	12.4	6.0	1.8	–	38.4	7.1	19.1
1991 regional election	26 May 1991	—N/a	38.0	18.8	5.0	4.0	1.7	—N/a	29.0	19.2

=== Victory preferences ===
The table below lists opinion polling on the victory preferences for each party in the event of a regional election taking place.

Polling firm/Commissioner	Fieldwork date	Sample size	PSOE	PP	Other/ None	Question	Lead
CIS	24 Apr–10 May 1995	1,198	46.1	26.4	0.8	26.8	19.7
CIS	2–17 Mar 1995	1,196	45.9	29.3	–	24.8	16.6

=== Victory likelihood ===
The table below lists opinion polling on the perceived likelihood of victory for each party in the event of a regional election taking place.

Polling firm/Commissioner	Fieldwork date	Sample size	PSOE	PP	Other/ None	Question	Lead
CIS	24 Apr–10 May 1995	1,198	43.9	24.0	0.0	32.1	19.9
CIS	2–17 Mar 1995	1,196	42.2	27.8	–	30.0	14.4

=== Preferred President ===
The table below lists opinion polling on leader preferences to become president of the Regional Government of Extremadura.

Polling firm/Commissioner	Fieldwork date	Sample size			Other/ None/ Not care	Question	Lead
Polling firm/Commissioner	Fieldwork date	Sample size	Ibarra PSOE	Barrero PP	Other/ None/ Not care	Question	Lead
CIS	24 Apr–10 May 1995	1,198	47.5	23.9	3.0	25.6	23.6
CIS	2–17 Mar 1995	1,196	44.6	22.0	5.6	27.9	22.6

== Results ==
=== Overall ===
← Summary of the 28 May 1995 Assembly of Extremadura election results →
Parties and alliances	Popular vote			Seats	
Parties and alliances	Votes	%	±pp	Total	+/−
Spanish Socialist Workers' Party (PSOE)	289,149	43.94	−10.22	31	−8
People's Party (PP)	259,703	39.46	+12.68	27	+8
United Left–The Greens–Commitment to Extremadura (IU–LV–CE)^{1}	69,387	10.54	+2.39	6	+2
Extremaduran Coalition (CEx)^{2}	25,168	3.82	−0.17	1	+1
Independent Socialists of Extremadura (SIEx)	7,722	1.17	New	0	±0
Communist Party of the Peoples of Spain (PCPE)	1,136	0.17	−0.24	0	±0
Democratic and Social Centre (CDS)	n/a	n/a	−5.73	0	−3
Blank ballots	5,804	0.88	+0.10		
Total	658,069			65	±0
Valid votes	658,069	99.34	±0.00		
Invalid votes	4,375	0.66	±0.00		
Votes cast / turnout	662,444	78.33	+7.48		
Abstentions	183,284	21.67	−7.48		
Registered voters	845,728				
Sources
Footnotes: ^{1} United Left–The Greens–Commitment to Extremadura results are compared to the combined totals of United Left and The Greens in the 1991 election.; ^{2} Extremaduran Coalition results are compared to the combined totals of United Extremadura and Extremaduran Regionalist Party in the 1991 election.

Popular vote
PSOE	43.94%
PP	39.46%
IU–LV–CE	10.54%
CEx	3.82%
SIEx	1.17%
PCPE	0.17%
Blank ballots	0.88%

Seats
PSOE	47.69%
PP	41.54%
IU–LV–CE	9.23%
CEx	1.54%

=== Distribution by constituency ===
Constituency	PSOE		PP		IU–LV		CEx	
Constituency	%	S	%	S	%	S	%	S
Badajoz	44.4	17	38.5	14	12.1	4	2.5	−
Cáceres	43.2	14	41.0	13	8.1	2	5.9	1
Total	43.9	31	39.5	27	10.5	6	3.8	1

== Aftermath ==
=== Government formation ===
Investiture; Nomination of Juan Carlos Rodríguez Ibarra (PSOE)
Ballot →	12 July 1995	14 July 1995
Required majority →	33 out of 65	Simple
Yes: • PSOE (31)	31 / 65	31 / 65
No: • PP (27); • IU–LV (6) (on 12 Jul)	33 / 65	27 / 65
Abstentions: • IU–LV (5) (on 14 Jul); • EU (1)	1 / 65	6 / 65
Absentees: • IU–LV (1) (on 14 Jul)	0 / 65	1 / 65

== Bibliography ==
- Ley Orgánica 1/1983, de 25 de febrero, de Estatuto de Autonomía de Extremadura (Organic Law 1/1983). Official State Gazette (in Spanish). 25 February 1983 [version as of 25 March 1994]. BOE-A-1983-6190.
- Ley 2/1984, de 7 de junio, del Gobierno y de la Administración de la Comunidad Autónoma de Extremadura (Law 2/1984). Official State Gazette (in Spanish). 7 June 1984. BOE-A-1984-17656.
- Ley Orgánica 5/1985, de 19 de junio, del Régimen Electoral General (Organic Law 5/1985). Official State Gazette (in Spanish). 19 June 1985 [version as of 24 March 1995]. BOE-A-1985-11672.
- Ley 2/1987, de 16 de marzo, de Elecciones a la Asamblea de Extremadura (Law 2/1987). Official State Gazette (in Spanish). 16 March 1987 [version as of 26 March 1991]. BOE-A-1987-8817.
- Decreto del Presidente 12/1995, de 3 de abril, por el que se convocan elecciones a la Asamblea de Extremadura (PDF) (Decree 12/1995). Official Journal of Extremadura (in Spanish). 3 April 1995.
