= Lidia Redondo de Lucas =

Spanish politician (1966–2018)

Lidia Redondo de Lucas (5 February 1966 – 13 April 2018) was a Spanish politician.

Born in Losar de la Vera on 5 February 1966, Redondo de Lucas studied anthropology at the Autonomous University of Barcelona. She joined the Extremaduran Regionalist Party in 1990, and served on the Losar de la Vera municipal council between 1995 and 1999, representing the Extremaduran Coalition. She was appointed to the Senate in 2005, in place of José Javier Corominas Rivera, and served until 2008. After Aniceto González Sánchez resigned his post with the Extremaduran Coalition, Redondo de Lucas was named his successor. She stepped down in March 2010, and died at the age of 52 on 13 April 2018.
