= United Left Extremadura =

United Left Extremadura Izquierda Unida Extremadura
- General Coordinator: Joaquín Macías
- Merger of: Communist Party of Extremadura; Open Left; Communist Youth of Extremadura; Republican Left; Independents
- Headquarters: C/ Morerías, 2B (1º EF). 06800 - Mérida
- Ideology: Socialism; Anticapitalism; Communism; Republicanism; Federalism; Feminism
- Political position: Left-wing
- National affiliation: Izquierda Unida
- Regional affiliation: Unidas por Extremadura (since 2019)
- Congreso de los Diputados (Extremaduran seats): 0 / 10
- Spanish Senate (Extremaduran seats): 0 / 10
- Assembly of Extremadura: 4 / 65
- Local representatives (2015-2019): 122 / 3,349

Website
- www.iuextremadura.org

United Left Extremadura (Spanish: Izquierda Unida Extremadura) is the Extremaduran federation of the Spanish left wing political and social movement United Left. Joaquín Macías is the current General Coordinator.

The Communist Party of Extremadura (PCEx, Extremaduran federation of PCE) is the major member of the coalition.

María Teresa Rejas of the United List became the first woman to serve as president of the Assembly of Extremadura.

== See also ==
- United Left (Spain)
- Communist Party of Extremadura
