= Independent Socialists of Extremadura =

Independent Socialists of Extremadura Socialistas Independientes de Extremadura
- President: José Antonio Jimenez García
- Secretary-General: José María Sánchez Navarro
- Founded: 1994
- Dissolved: 2018
- Ideology: Social democracy Extremaduran regionalism
- Political position: Centre-left
- Assembly of Extremadura: 2 / 65

Website
- siextremadura.com[fault link]

Independent Socialists of Extremadura (Spanish: Socialistas Independientes de Extremadura, SIEx) was a centre-left regionalist political party in the Spanish Autonomous Community of Extremadura.

In 2018, the majority of the party chose to join the Extremaduran PSOE
