= Extremaduran Coalition =

Extremaduran Coalition Coalición Extremeña
- President: Victoriano Durán
- Secretary-General: Estanislao Martín
- Founded: 1995
- Ideology: Regionalism; Federalism; Social democracy
- Political position: Centre-left
- Town councillors: 60 / 3,292

Website
- prex-crex.blogspot.com

CE symbol

original logo

Extremaduran Coalition (Spanish: Coalición Extremeña) is a political alliance in Extremadura, Spain. It consists of the Regionalist Convergence of Extremadura (CREx) and the Extremaduran Regionalist Party (PREx).

The coalition was represented in the Senate of Spain between 2005 and 2008 by Lidia Redondo Lucas, who was elected as a substitute on the Spanish Socialist Workers' Party list.

== Composition ==
Party
Extremaduran Regionalist Party (PREx)
Regionalist Convergence of Extremadura (CREx)
