= United Extremadura =

United Extremadura Extremadura Unida
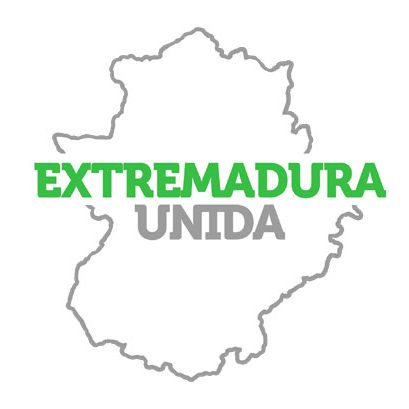
- President: Pedro Cañada Castillo
- Secretary-General: Juan Pedro Domínguez
- Founded: 1980
- Ideology: Extremaduran regionalism
- Political position: Centre-right
- Assembly of Extremadura: 0 / 65
- Town councillors: 15 / 3,350

Website
- www.extremaduraunida.es

United Extremadura (Spanish: Extremadura Unida, EU) is a centre-right regionalist political party in the Spanish Autonomous Community of Extremadura.

It was registered in 1981. In the 2023 municipal, regional, and general elections they were a part of the coalition known as LEVANTA.
