= Regionalist Convergence of Extremadura =

Regionalist Convergence of Extremadura Convergencia Regionalista de Extremadura
- Leader: Tomás Martín Tamayo
- Registered: 1992
- Ideology: Regionalism
- Regional affiliation: Extremaduran Coalition (since 1995)

Regionalist Convergence of Extremadura (Spanish: Convergencia Regionalista de Extremadura, CREx) is a political party in Extremadura. Since 1995 it has been part of Extremaduran Coalition.
