= Communist Party of Extremadura =

PCEx sticker

The Communist Party of Extremadura (in Spanish: Partido Comunista de Extremadura) is the federation of the Communist Party of Spain (PCE) in Extremadura.
