= Extremaduran Regionalist Party =

Extremaduran Regionalist Party Partido Regionalista Extremeño
- Leader: Estanislao Martín
- Registered: 10 January 1990
- Ideology: Regionalism
- Regional affiliation: Extremaduran Coalition (since 1995)

Extremaduran Regionalist Party (Spanish: Partido Regionalista Extremeño, PREx) is a political party in Extremadura. Since 1995 it has been part of Extremaduran Coalition.
