= Sierra Suroeste =

Coordinates: 38°19′N 6°46′W

- Comarca
- The Ardila River, forming the border with Portugal.

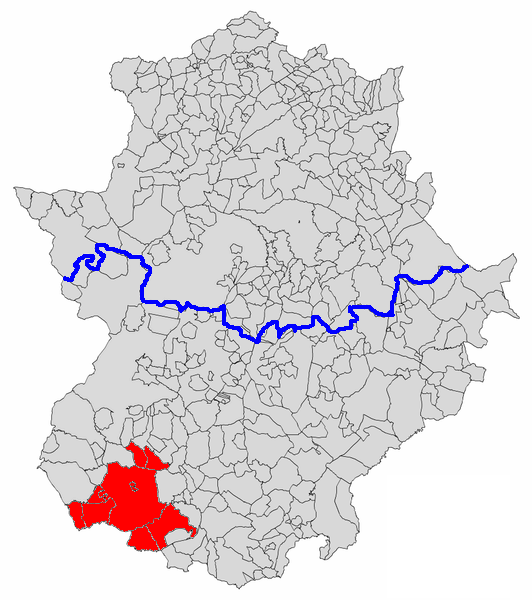
- Country: Spain
- Autonomous community: Extremadura
- Province: Badajoz
- Capital: Jerez de los Caballeros
- Municipalities: List: Fregenal de la Sierra, Higuera la Real, Jerez de los Caballeros, Oliva de la Frontera, Salvaleón, Salvatierra de los Barros, Valencia del Mombuey, Valle de Matamoros, Valle de Santa Ana, Zahínos

Area
  - Total: 1,527.75 km^{2} (589.87 sq mi)

Population (2015)
  - Total: 31,324
  - Density: 20.503/km^{2} (53.103/sq mi)
- Time zone: UTC+1 (CET)
  - Summer (DST): UTC+2 (CEST)
- Largest municipality: Jerez de los Caballeros

Sierra Suroeste is a comarca (county, with no administrative role) located in southwestern province of Badajoz in the autonomous community of Extremadura, western Spain. Its capital and largest city is Jerez de los Caballeros.

Sierra Suroeste borders the comarcas of Tierra de Badajoz and Tierra de Barros to the north, Zafra - Río Bodión and Tentudía to the east, and Llanos de Olivenza to the west. The river Ardila, which runs between Andalucía and Portugal, borders the comarca to the south.

The comarca contains ten municipalities: Fregenal de la Sierra, Higuera la Real, Jerez de los Caballeros, Oliva de la Frontera, Salvaleón, Salvatierra de los Barros, Valencia del Mombuey, Valle de Matamoros, Valle de Santa Ana, and Zahínos.

== History ==
=== Prehistory ===
Prehistoric artifacts have been found in the municipalities of Jerez de los Caballeros, Higuera la Real, Valencia del Mombuey and Oliva de la Frontera. Two stone celtic idols were found in the hermitage of Nuestra Señora Virgen de Gracia in Oliva de la Frontera. Celtic fortifications have been excavated in Higuera. Various dolmens can still be seen throughout the area, the most notable being the Neolithic Piedra Pinchá in Valencia del Mombuey, and the dolmen del Toriñuelo in Jerez de los Caballeros.

=== Roman Empire ===
During the Roman occupation, Sierra Suroeste belonged to several different political regions. First the comarca was a part of Hispania Ulterior, then later being split in two, with part belonging to the province of Lusitania and the other part to Hispania Baetica. The towns that existed during that period were known by different names:

- Jerez de los Caballeros: Fama Iulia Seria
- Oliva de la Frontera: Caesaróbriga
- Fregenal de la Sierra: Nertóbriga

Though other towns in the comarca, such as Salvaleón, claim to have origins during the Roman Empire, there exists no evidence to support these claims.

Jerez de los Caballeros is home to a number of mosaics, stone stairs, and the bridges of Pontón and Viejo, all of which date to early Roman construction. Oliva de la Frontera was a Roman copper-working center, as evidenced by the discovery of 250 metalworking ovens and the remains copper mines and excavated ores. Coins from the different periods of the Roman Empire have been found throughout the comarca.

=== Visigoths ===
A number of inscribed columns date back to the period of the Visigoth occupation of the Iberian Peninsula. One such inscription, found in the church of Santa María de la Encarnación in Jerez de los Caballeros, dates to 25 December 556. Another, found near Oliva de la Frontera, is inscribed by Count Theudimer in the year 662 CE.

Other inscriptions from this period have also been found. A grave marker dating back to 514 was found on a farm near Alcobaza, and another dating back to 662 was found in a field by Valle de Matamoros. Additionally, latticework from the hermitage of the Virgen de Gracia is of Visigoth design.

There is evidence that the municipalities of Fregenal de la Sierra and Salvaleón were established during this time period.

=== Moorish conquest and Reconquista ===
The Moors introduced a number of technological improvements to the daily life of the area. Especially impacted were agricultural practices, such as plowing, wherein the Arabs introduced new methodologies that greatly improved upon the efficiency of existing Roman techniques.

Around the year 1230, Alfonso IX, King of León, conquered the area. Alfonso orchestrated a great massacre of Moors in the area now known as Valle de Matamoros (literally, "valley of killing Moors"). Ten years later, Alfonso led a military campaign through the province to assure its safety, before ceding control of the territory to the Knights Templar.

=== Renaissance ===
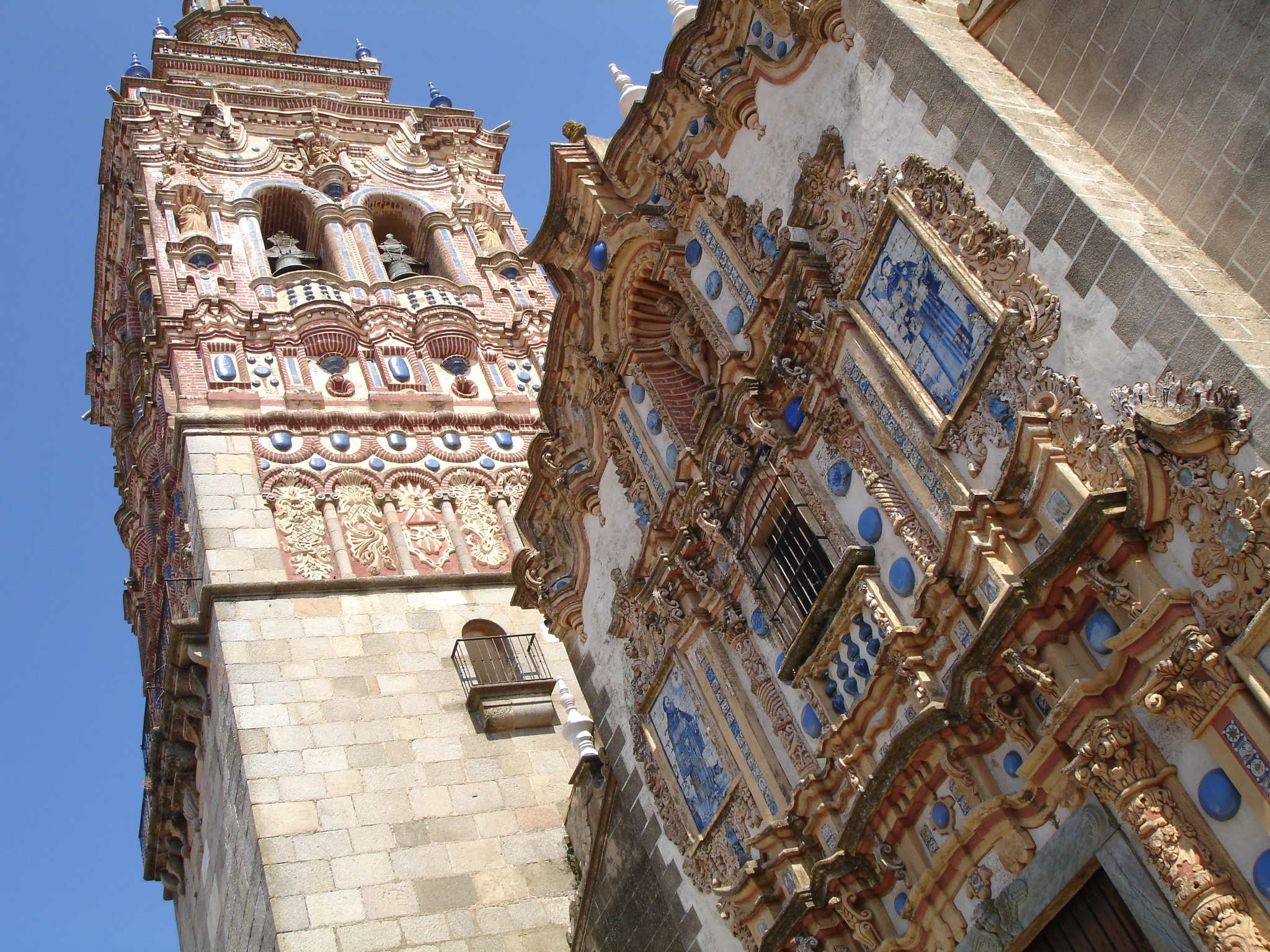
Church of San Bartolomé, in Jerez de los Caballeros

The territory experienced a great population boom and flourishing of local economies when the Knights Templar took control of the area. The Templar founded the municipality of Zahínos as a military fortification, and which was later expanded to become a castle, around which the town grew. In 1312 CE, Pope Clement V dissolved the Order of the Templar, and the Knights' lands and titles were transferred to the Spanish crown. The Knights mounted a resistance in Jerez de los Caballeros, and were summarily executed in the castle nearby. The tower in which their throats were slit is now known as the Torre Sangrienta (literally, the bleeding tower).

The various municipalities that today make up the comarca were then divided among a number of nobles. Oliva de la Frontera, Valencia del Mombuey, and Salvaleón belonged to the Duchy of Feria. Valle de Matamoro and Jerez de los Caballero fell under the control of the Order of Santiago. Fregenal de la Sierra and Higuera la Real became a part of Sevilla.

A number of well-known conquistadors came from Sierra Suroeste, such as Alonso Rodríguez Santos and Hernando de Soto. Perhaps the most famous of these was Vasco Núñez de Balboa, who was born in Jerez de los Caballeros, and who is best known for conquering Panama and discovering the Pacific Ocean.

== Geography ==
The Sierra Morena mountains intersect the comarca. In this mountain range there can be found a number of major peaks, including: San Cristóbal, Oratorio, del Coto, de la Herrumbre, de la Corte, del Peñón, de Monsalud, de Santa María, de san José, de Botello, de la Cazuela and de las Mesas. The tallest peaks are:

- La Mira (Salvatierra de los Barros): 815 m
- Peña Utrera (Salvatierra de los Barros): 813 m
- Santa María II (Salvaleón): 806 m
- San José (Valle de Matamoros): 787 m
- San Cristóbal (Higuera la Real): 776 m

A large number of rivers also run through Sierra Suroeste, the most important of which is the Guadiana. The Ardila Rivers, which forms the border with Portugal, is a tributary of the Guadiana in Extremadura. Other important rivers include the Sillo, Bodíón, Zaos, and Godolid rivers.

=== Flora and fauna ===
Sierra Suroeste is one of the most productive jamón ibérico-producing regions of Spain, thanks in part to the abundance of black Iberian pigs in the area. The acorn-eating bovines share the fields with large numbers of horses, sheep, goats, cows, donkeys, mules, and chickens. Additionally, the forests are home to significant numbers of a variety of game animals, especially deer, wild boar, and foxes.

The European Union-designated Special Protection Area Dehesas de Jerez covers 480 km^{2} and occupies approximately third of the comarca. More than thirty mated pairs of black storks make their nests in this area. In addition, numerous other storks roost in the belfries of various churches throughout the comarca.

The comarca is home to large quantities of holm oak and cork oak, two sources of cork and coal. Other common trees include olive trees, chestnut trees, and grape vines. Town plazas are usually decorated with palm and white mulberry trees, especially along the Paseo de las Palmeras in Oliva de la Frontera.

The holm oak forests of the area are some of the oldest and best established of all Extremadura, resulting in a variety of flora and fauna being able to develop in these areas. Hiking and sightseeing in these areas is a popular tourist activity, and there are many hiking paths and trails throughout the territory.

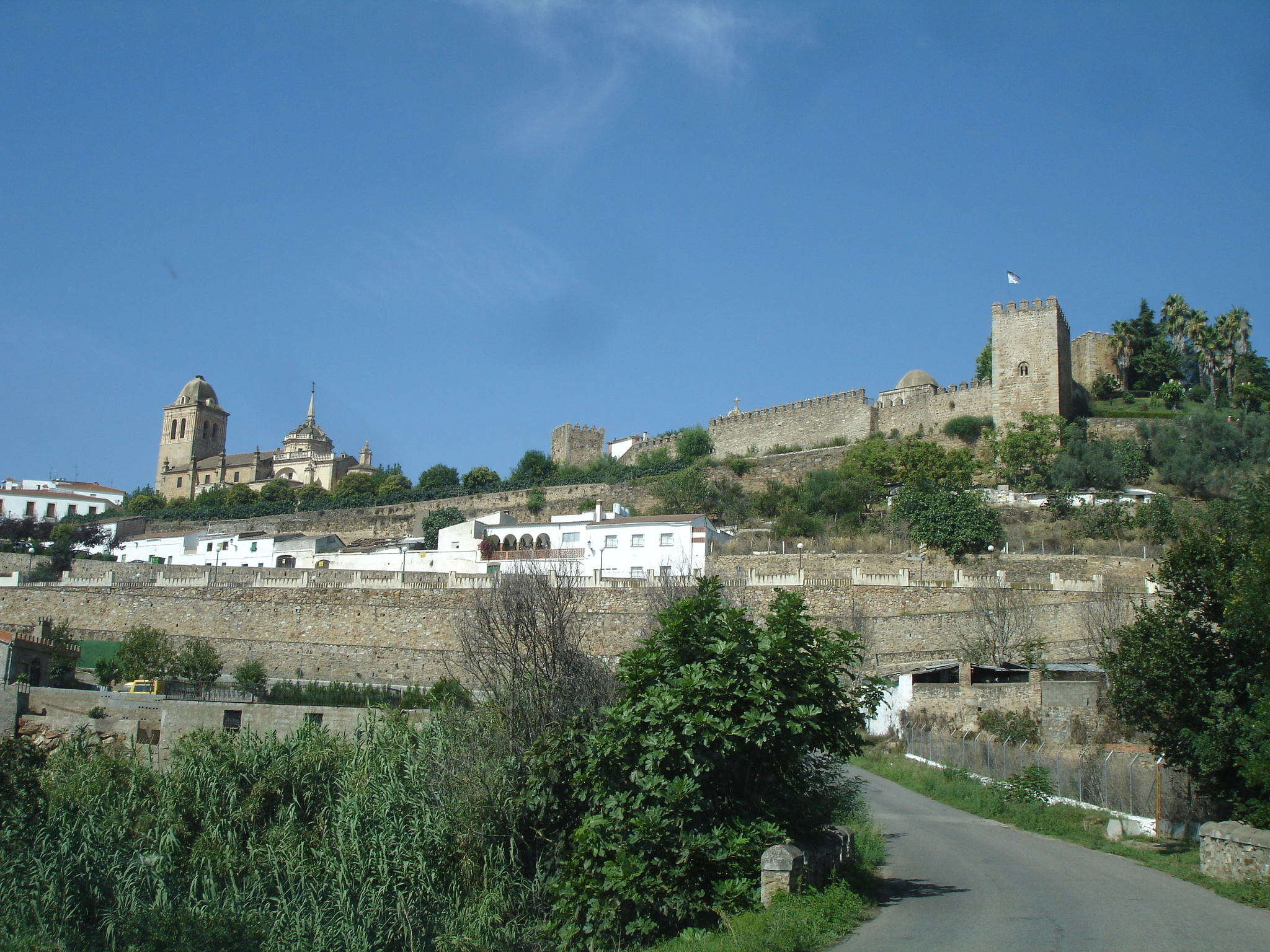
View of the old quarter of Jerez de los Caballeros.

== Main sights ==
Sierra Suroeste is home to a number of officially designated historical monuments. Each municipality is host to several of these historic places, which account for the majority of tourism to the area.

- Fregenal de la Sierra is home to a castle, the hermitage of the virgen de los Remedios, the church of Santa María, the church of Santa Ana, and the church of Santa Catalina.
- Higuera la Real has the Celtic Castro de Capote, the hermitage of the virgen de Lorento, the hermitage of the virgen del Socorro, the statue of "La Mamarracha", and the churches of Santa Catalina and San Bartolomé.
- Jerez de los Caballeros boasts a castle, with the aforementioned Torre Sangriente; the churches of San Miguel, San Bartolomé, Santa Catalina, and Santa María de la Encarnación; the park of Santa Lucía; the Celtic dolmen of Toriñuelo; and the Roman mosaics of Pomar.

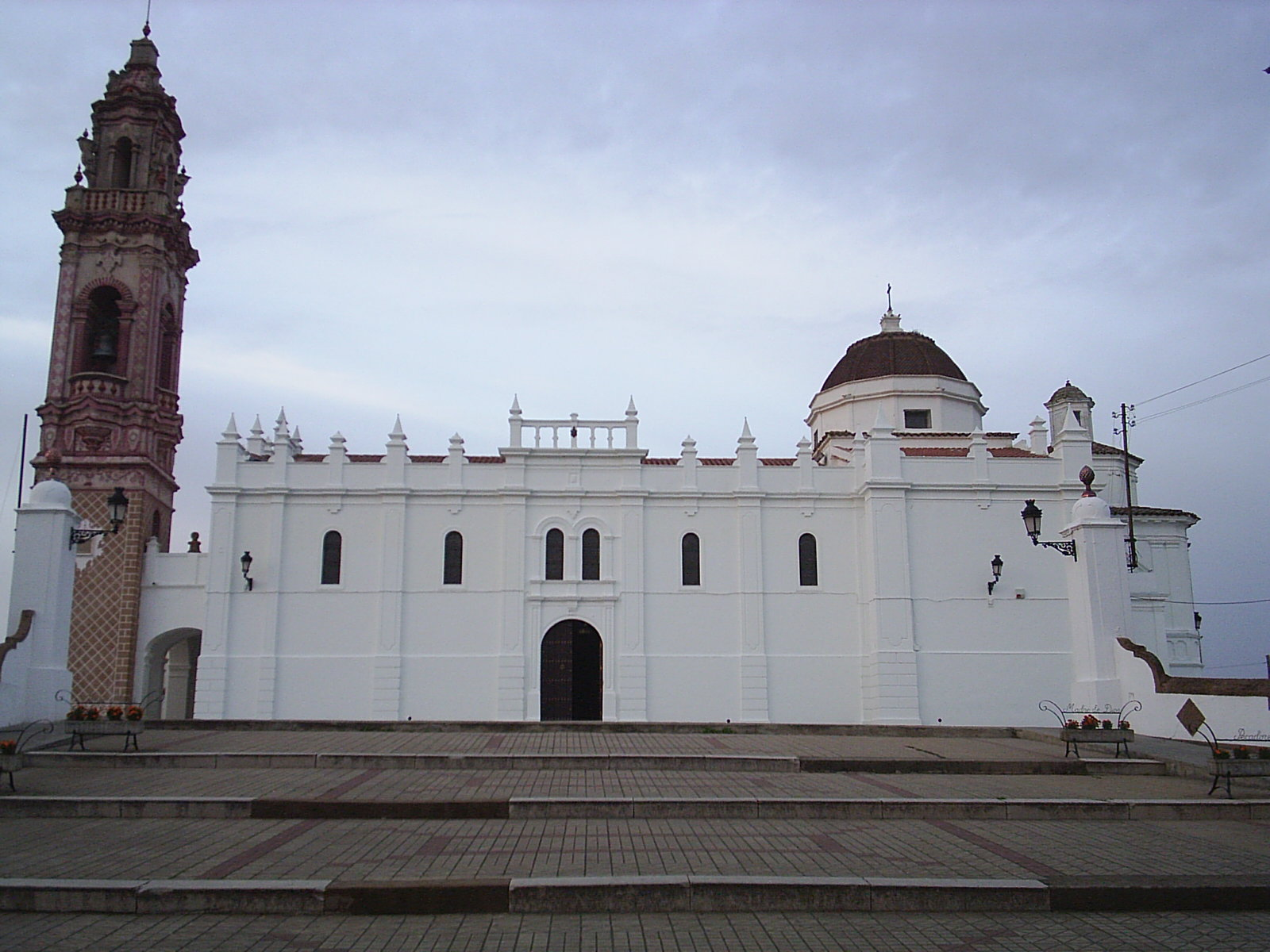
Santuario de la Virgen de Gracia in Oliva de la Frontera.

- Oliva de la Frontera is home to the Santuario de la virgen de Gracia, the church of San Marcos Evangelista, the hermitage of San Pedro, the hermitage of San Isidro, and the house of the Duke of Feria.
- Salvaleón has the church of Santa Marta, hermitage of the virgen de Aguasantas, a Roman villa, and the Celtic dolmen of Toril.
- Salvatierra de los Barros boasts a castle, the church of San Blas, the hermitage of the Mártires, and the Pottery Museum.
- Valencia del Mombuey is home to the church of the Purísima Concepción, the palace of the Marquis of Valdeterrazo, and the dolmen of the "Piedra Pinchá".
- Valle de Matamoros has the Church of the Asunción, and the fountains of Borbollón, El Coso, Barranquillo and Vázquez.
- Valle de Santa Ana boasts the pulpit and church of Santa Ana, and the Rubiales grotto.
- Zahínos is home to a large Teutonic fortified tower, the church of the virgen de los Remedios, the cross of Calvary, and the hermitage of San Sireno.

== Culture ==
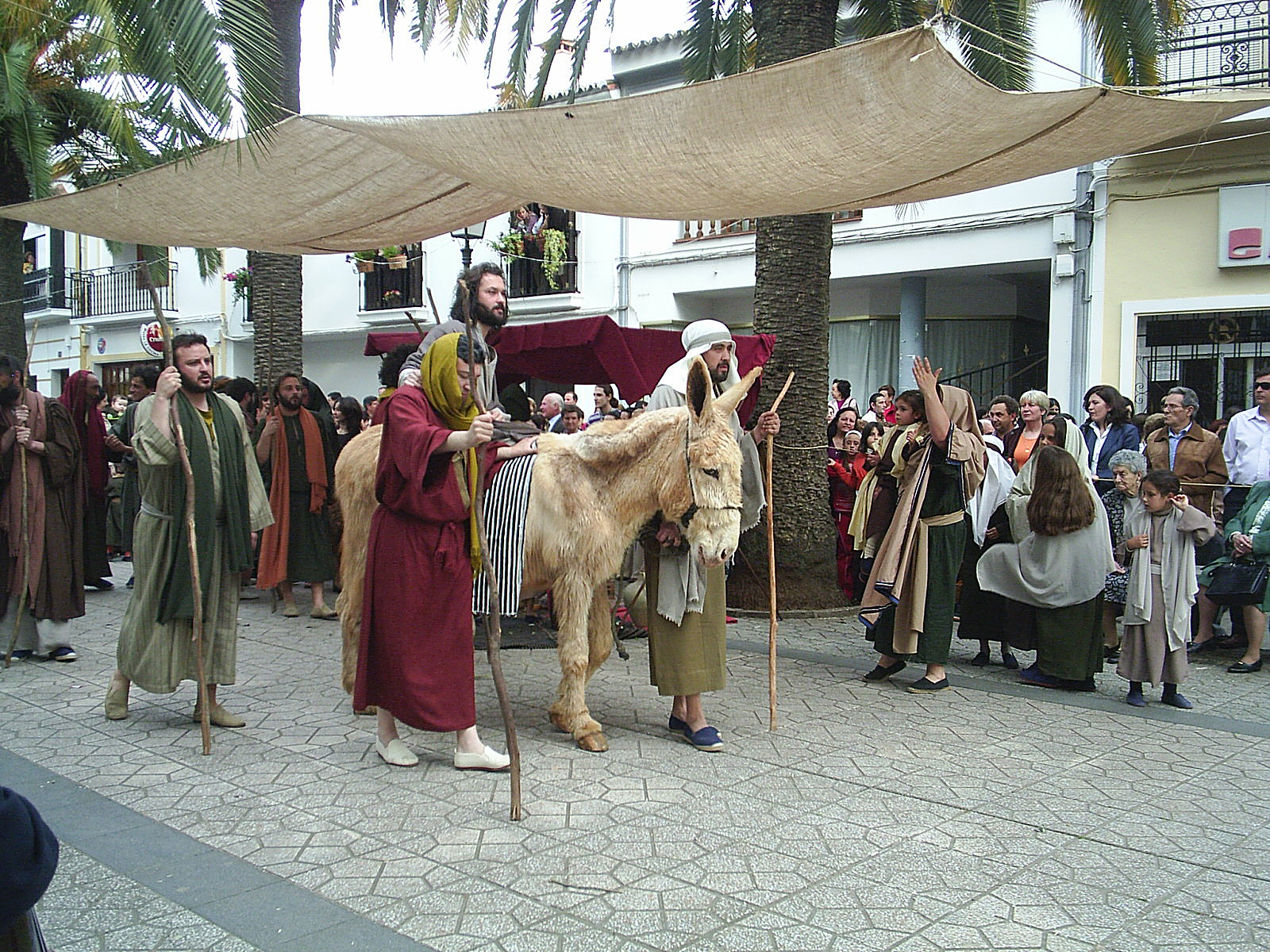
Passion play in Oliva de la Frontera.

The comarca has three major tourist festivals: the passion play in Oliva de la Frontera, Holy Week in Jerez de los Caballeros, and the International Folklore Festival in Fregenal de la Sierra. Jerez de los Caballeros celebrates an annual Exposition of Jamón Ibérico, sometimes called the Festival of Jamón.

One of the major traditional industries of the municipality of Salvatierra de los Barros is pottery, to the point at which it is home to a museum dedicated to the pottery industry as well as an annual pottery fair, the Feria Ibérica de la Alfarería del Barro.

Authors and playwrights born in the area include Benito Arias Montano, Manuel García Torrado, José Ramírez López Uría, José Luis Gil Soto and Milagros Frías.

=== Gastronomy ===
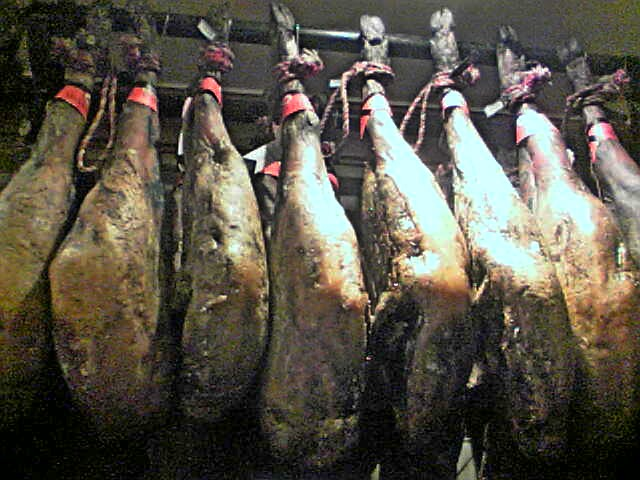
Curing jamones ibéricos.

Due to the proximity to Huelva, and the comarca's natural abundance of black Iberian pigs, many pork products are produced and consumed in Sierra Suroeste. These products include, for example, chorizo, salchichón, blood sausages, loins and other cuts, and jamón ibérico.

Some typical dishes include chickpea stew, migas, pisto, caldereta, and bacalao "dorao". Also popular are dishes of nearby Portugal, which are made in a similar manner as across the border.

== Sports ==
The most popular sport in the comarca, like in much of the rest of Spain, is football. The most popular local team is Jerez CF, which has played in Segunda División B, but currently plays in the Tercera División. Also popular are the various municipal futsal tournaments, as well as the provincial juvenile tourneys.

Basketball is also growing in popularity.

== Famous residents ==
- Vasco Núñez de Balboa (1475–1519), explorer, governor and conquistador.
- Hernando de Soto (1496–1541), explorer and conquistador who discovered the Mississippi River.
- Benito Arias Montano (1527–1598), orientalist and editor of the Antwerp Polyglot.
- Francisco Peña Romero (born 1978), football player who currently plays for Real Murcia of the Spanish La Liga.
