= Manuel Naharro =

Spanish politician

Manuel Naharro Gata (born 4 May 1986) is a Spanish politician of the People's Party (PP). He was elected mayor of Valencia del Mombuey in 2007 and president of the PP in the Province of Badajoz in 2021. First elected to the Assembly of Extremadura in 2023, he was voted the legislature's president in 2026.

== Biography ==
Naharro was elected mayor of Valencia del Mombuey in the Province of Badajoz in 2007. In June 2021, he was named president of the People's Party (PP) in the province, having run unopposed.

For the 2023 Extremaduran regional election, he was placed third on the PP list in the Badajoz constituency. With the PP and Spanish Socialist Workers' Party (PSOE) level on seats, and negotiations ongoing between the PP and Vox, the PSOE candidate Blanca Martín was elected President of the Assembly of Extremadura, the role of speaker, and Naharro the vice president.

A snap election was called for December 2025 and Naharro was again third on the PP list in Badajoz. During the election campaign, the PSOE mayor of Mérida, Antonio Rodríguez Osuna, accused Naharro of offering jobs for sex and called for him to resign; Naharro responded by saying that the case against him had been closed without charge in December 2024 and that he would sue Rodríguez Osuna for libel. The PP became the largest group in the Assembly of Extremadura, but did not win a majority. On 20 January 2026, Naharro was elected to the presidency of the legislature, in exchange for allowing Vox to hold the position of first secretary; he became the second PP member to hold the office, after Fernando Manzano (2011–2015).
