= Juan Pizarro =

Juan Pizarro may refer to:

- Juan Pizarro (conquistador) (c. 1511–1535), Spanish conquistador
- Juan Pizarro (politician) (1934–2022), Spanish physician and politician
- Juan Pizarro (baseball) (1937–2021), Puerto Rican baseball pitcher
