= Miguel Ángel Nacarino =

Spanish politician (born 1978)

Member of the Senate
- Incumbent
- Assumed office 25 July 2018
- Preceded by: Juan Andrés Tovar
- Constituency: Cáceres

Personal details
- Born: 15 July 1978 (age 47)
- Party: Spanish Socialist Workers' Party

Miguel Ángel Nacarino Muriel (born 15 July 1978) is a Spanish politician serving as a member of the Senate since 2018. He is the spokesperson of the Spanish Socialist Workers' Party in the international cooperation and development committee.
