= Bruno Aguilera-Barchet =

Spanish legal historian (born 1956)

- Born: October 16, 1956 (age 70); Madrid, Spain

Academic background
- Education: Complutense University of Madrid

Academic work
- Discipline: Legal history
- Sub-discipline: Comparative law; History of public law
- Institutions: Complutense University of Madrid; University of Extremadura; King Juan Carlos University
- Notable works: A History of Western Public Law: Between Nation and State (2015); The Oxford Handbook of European Legal History (contributor, 2018); Tratado de Derecho Pop (2021)

Bruno Aguilera-Barchet (born 1956) is a Spanish legal historian and professor of the history of law at King Juan Carlos University in Madrid. He is the director of the university's Institute of International Legal Studies (Instituto Universitario de Estudios Jurídicos Internacionales). His research focuses on the comparative history of Western public law and the European legal tradition.

== Education and academic career ==
Aguilera-Barchet was born in Madrid in 1956. He studied law at the Complutense University of Madrid, where he obtained his licentiate and later a doctorate in law. He taught at the Complutense University of Madrid from 1982 to 1991, before becoming professor of the history of law at the University of Extremadura. In 1996, he joined King Juan Carlos University, where he subsequently served as secretary general (1997–2000) and dean of the Faculty of Legal and Social Sciences (2001–2003). He has directed the Institute of International Legal Studies since 2003. He has been a visiting researcher at Harvard Law School (1995–1996) and McGill University (2019), and a visiting professor at the University of New Mexico School of Law, the University of Milan and Paris-Est Créteil University. From 2007 to 2023, he was a member of the Academic Council of the Wilfried Martens Centre for European Studies, a think tank affiliated with the European People's Party.

== Research and publications ==
Aguilera-Barchet has published works on legal history, comparative public law and the development of European legal institutions. His monograph Historia de la letra de cambio en España. Seis siglos de práctica trayecticia (1988) examines the history of the bill of exchange in Spain. Entre Estado y nación. Sociedad, poder y derecho, de la prehistoria a la integración europea (2011) addresses the development of Western political and legal institutions.

An expanded English-language version, A History of Western Public Law: Between Nation and State, was published by Springer in 2015. He also contributed the chapter "The Law of the Welfare State" to The Oxford Handbook of European Legal History (Oxford University Press, 2018), examining the development of social protection legislation and the modern welfare state.

His other publications include Iniciación histórica al Derecho musulmán seguida de un ensayo sobre la historia jurídica de al-Ándalus (2007), concerning Islamic jurisprudence and the legal history of al-Andalus, and Tratado de Derecho Pop (2021), which uses literature, cinema and visual art to explain legal concepts. A related English-language book, Demystifying the Legal Art of Order, Power and Fun: An Introduction to Pop Law, was published in 2025.

His work on the legal history of al-Andalus was discussed by Alejandro Martínez Dhier in a 2007 article on scholarship concerning Islamic law in Spain.

== Reception ==
Several of Aguilera-Barchet's books have been reviewed in academic journals of legal history. Historia de la letra de cambio en España was reviewed by Manuel J. Peláez in the Anuario de Historia del Derecho Español, while Iniciación histórica al Derecho musulmán was reviewed by Juan Martos Quesada in Foro and Byblos.

Entre Estado y nación received reviews in the Anuario de Historia del Derecho Español and the Zeitschrift der Savigny-Stiftung für Rechtsgeschichte. Estado y Derecho en España was reviewed by Yolanda Quesada Morillas, while A History of Western Public Law was reviewed by Alberto Muro, both in the Anuario de Historia del Derecho Español.

Tratado de Derecho Pop was reviewed by Gabriela Cobo del Rosal Pérez in the Anuario de Historia del Derecho Español and by Miguel Ángel Morales Payán in the Anuario de la Facultad de Derecho of the University of Extremadura.

== Honours ==
Aguilera-Barchet has been named an officer of the French Ordre des Palmes Académiques and holds the distinguished cross, first class, of the Order of San Raimundo de Peñafort.

== Selected publications ==
- Historia de la letra de cambio en España. Seis siglos de práctica trayecticia. Madrid: Tecnos, 1988. ISBN 84-309-1539-7.
- Introducción jurídica a la historia del Derecho. Madrid: Civitas, 2nd ed. 1996. ISBN 84-470-0809-6.
- Iniciación histórica al Derecho musulmán seguida de un ensayo sobre la historia jurídica de al-Ándalus. Madrid: Dykinson, 2007. ISBN 978-84-9849-129-6.
- Entre Estado y nación. Sociedad, poder y derecho, de la prehistoria a la integración europea. Madrid–Paris: Instituto de Estudios Jurídicos Internacionales / Faculté de Droit de l'Université de Paris Est, 2011. ISBN 9788461550609.
- A History of Western Public Law: Between Nation and State. Cham: Springer, 2015. ISBN 978-3-319-11802-4. doi:10.1007/978-3-319-11803-1.
- "The Law of the Welfare State", in The Oxford Handbook of European Legal History. Oxford: Oxford University Press, 2018, pp. 1001–1025. doi:10.1093/oxfordhb/9780198785521.013.44.
- Tratado de Derecho Pop. Cizur Menor: Thomson Reuters Aranzadi, 2021. ISBN 978-84-1391-051-2.
- Demystifying the Legal Art of Order, Power and Fun: An Introduction to Pop Law. Newcastle upon Tyne: Cambridge Scholars Publishing, 2025. ISBN 978-1-0364-5293-3.
