= Isabel María Povea Moreno =

Spanish historian

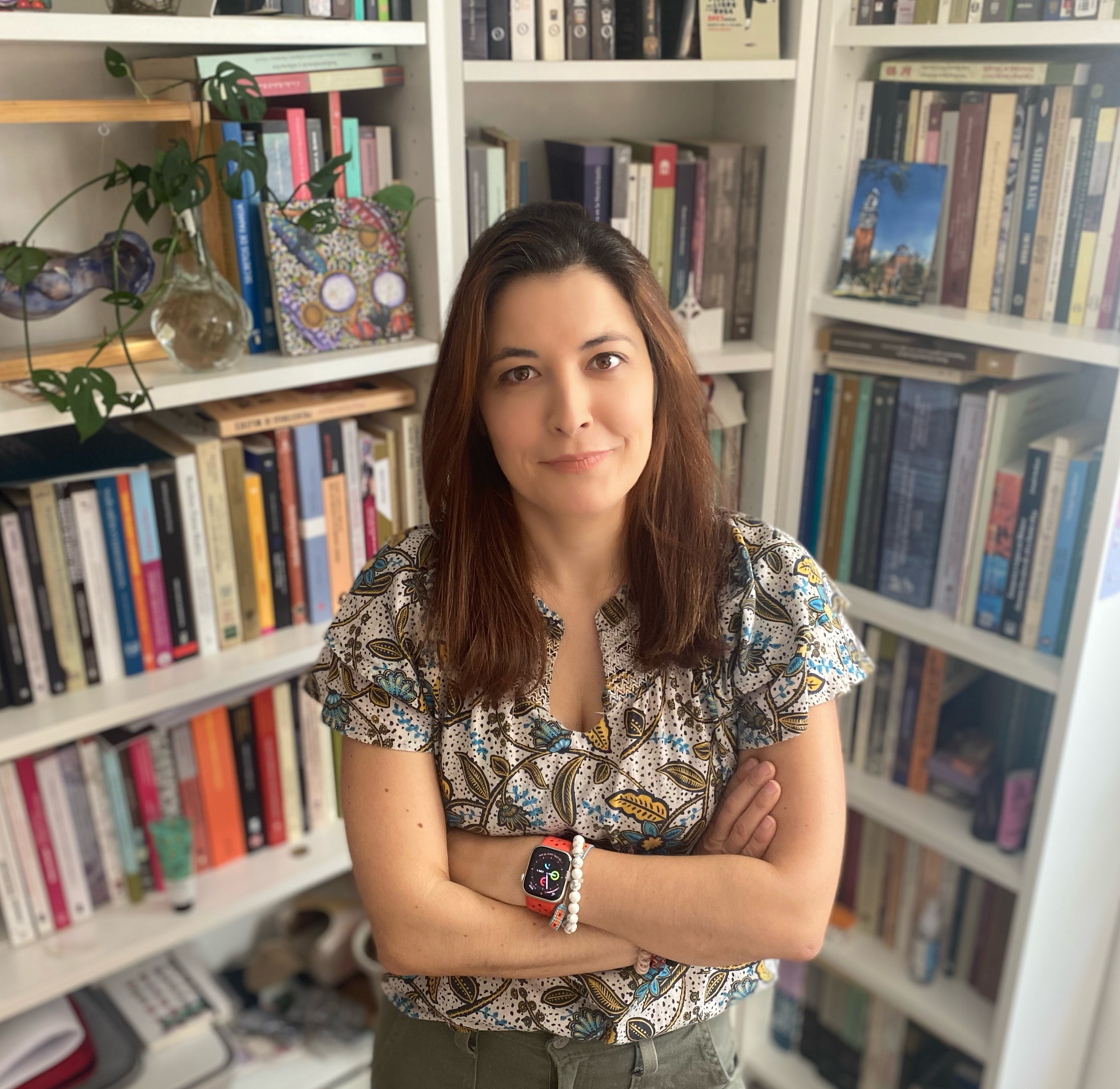
- Historian Isabel María Povea Moreno (2023)
- Born: July 7, 1982 (age 44); Province of Seville, Spain
- Occupation: Historian
- Known for: Minería y reformismo borbónico en el Perú. Estado, empresa y trabajadores en Huancavelica, 1784-1814 (2014)

Academic background
- Education: University of Granada (B.A. in History, 2005); University of Granada (Ph.D. in History, 2007)
- Thesis: Retrato de una decadencia. Régimen laboral y sistema de explotación en Huancavelica, 1784-1814 (2011)
- Doctoral advisor: Miguel Molina Martínez

Academic work
- Discipline: History
- Sub-discipline: Social History; History of Mining; Women's History
- Institutions: Centro de Investigaciones y Estudios Superiores en Antropología Social (CIESAS)
- Website: https://cdmx.ciesas.edu.mx/povea-moreno-isabel-maria/

Isabel María Povea Moreno (Spain, July 7, 1982) is a Spanish historian who has specialized in social history and mining history of Spanish America, with special emphasis on the history of women in colonial mining.

== Education and career ==
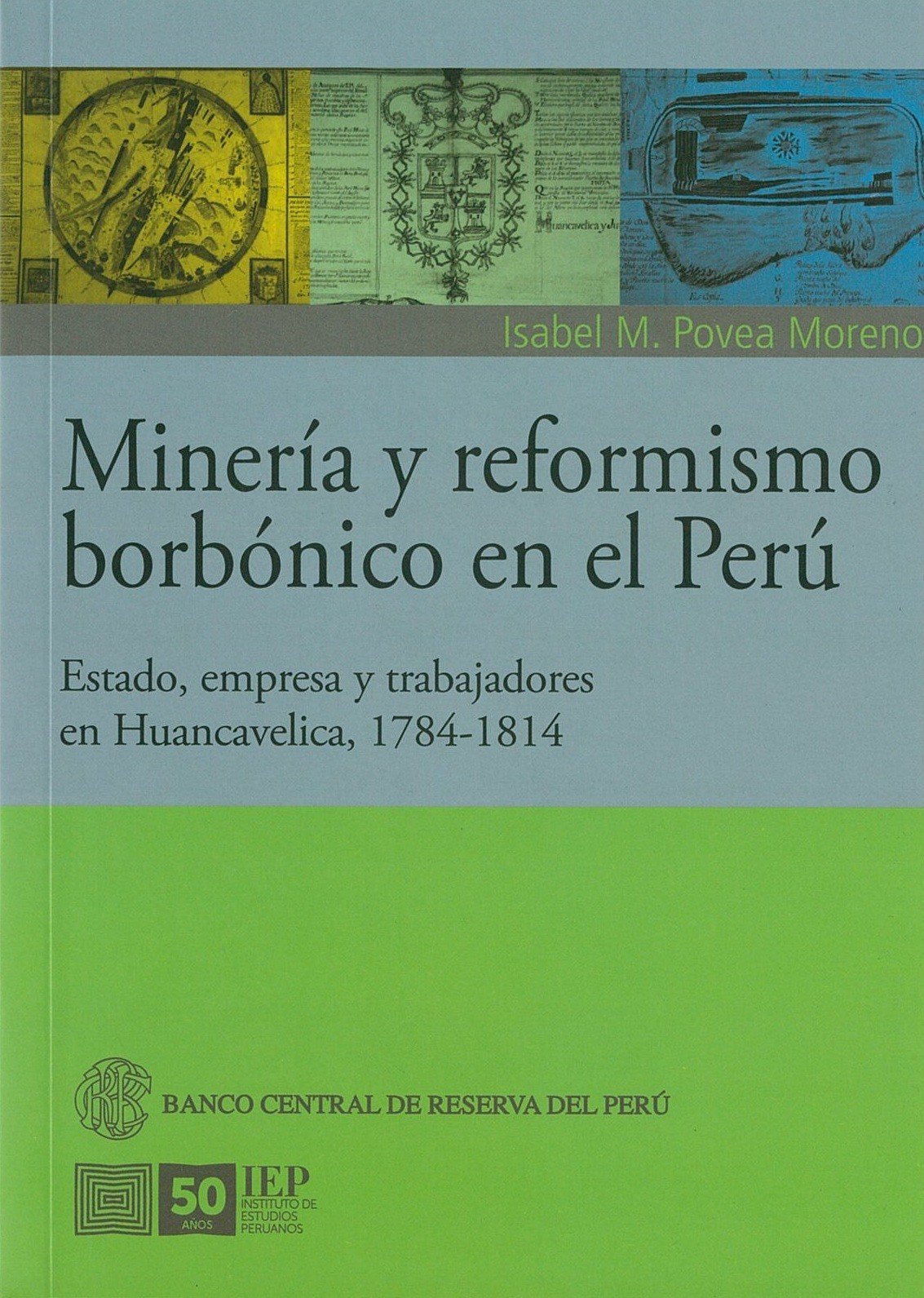
Minería y reformismo borbónico en el Perú. Estado, empresa y trabajadores en Huancavelica, 1784-1814 (2014)

Povea Moreno studied for a bachelor's degree, advanced studies diploma and doctorate in the History of the Americas at the University of Granada. Her doctoral dissertation, Retrato de una decadencia. Régimen laboral y sistema de explotación en Huancavelica, 1784-1814, was directed by Miguel Molina Martínez and she defended her dissertation on July 14, 2011. From 2012 to 2014, Povea Moreno completed a postdoctoral stay at the Instituto de Investigaciones Históricas of the Universidad Nacional Autónoma de México (UNAM). From 2015 to 2016, she was a visiting-professor at El Colegio de San Luis. From 2018 to 2021, she was a professor-researcher at the Instituto de Investigaciones Históricas of the Universidad Autónoma de Baja California. As of 2021, she is a professor-researcher at the Centro de Investigaciones y Estudios Superiores en Antropología Social (CIESAS).

The Mexican Committee of Historical Sciences awarded her in 2017 the prize for the best article in Social History of 2015 for "Coacción y disensión. Protestas frente a los repartimientos mineros en Perú y Nueva España, siglo XVIII" published in the journal Estudios de Historia Novohispana published by the Instituto de Investigaciones Históricas de la UNAM. She served as Secretary of the executive board of the Latin American and Iberian Association of Social History (ALIHS) from 2019 until October 2025, and has served as vice president since 7 October 2025, with a term ending in October 2027.

She is a member of the advisory board of the journal Huarte de San Juan. Geography and History (University of Navarra) since 2020, member of the editorial board of the journal Norba. Revista de Historia (University of Extremadura) since 2020, and is a member of the advisory board of the journal Temas Americanistas (University of Seville) since 2021.

In her book, Minería y reformismo borbónico en el Perú. Estado, empresa y trabajadores en Huancavelica, 1784-1814, Povea Moreno delves into the study of the social history of the mercury mines of Huancavelica, the various occupations of the workers and includes the importance of female work in the production of mercury. The great novelty of the book, according to the historian Miguel Molina Martínez, is the "analysis that it dedicates to the role played by women in the work of the mine." In 2015 the book was considered one of the 10 best books of history of Peru published in 2014, and occupying 5th place, based on a survey of 35 Peruvian and foreign historians carried out by the blog El Reportero de la Historia.

In her work on mining in New Spain, from different mines such as Zimapán, San Luis Potosí, or Zacatecas, she first studied mining conflicts related to labor practices; including the different ways in which gambling was carried out in these places. In a second stage, she studied the participation of women in mining in New Spain, expanding her analysis to colonial Spanish America, with emphasis on the historiographic "invisibility" of women and children.

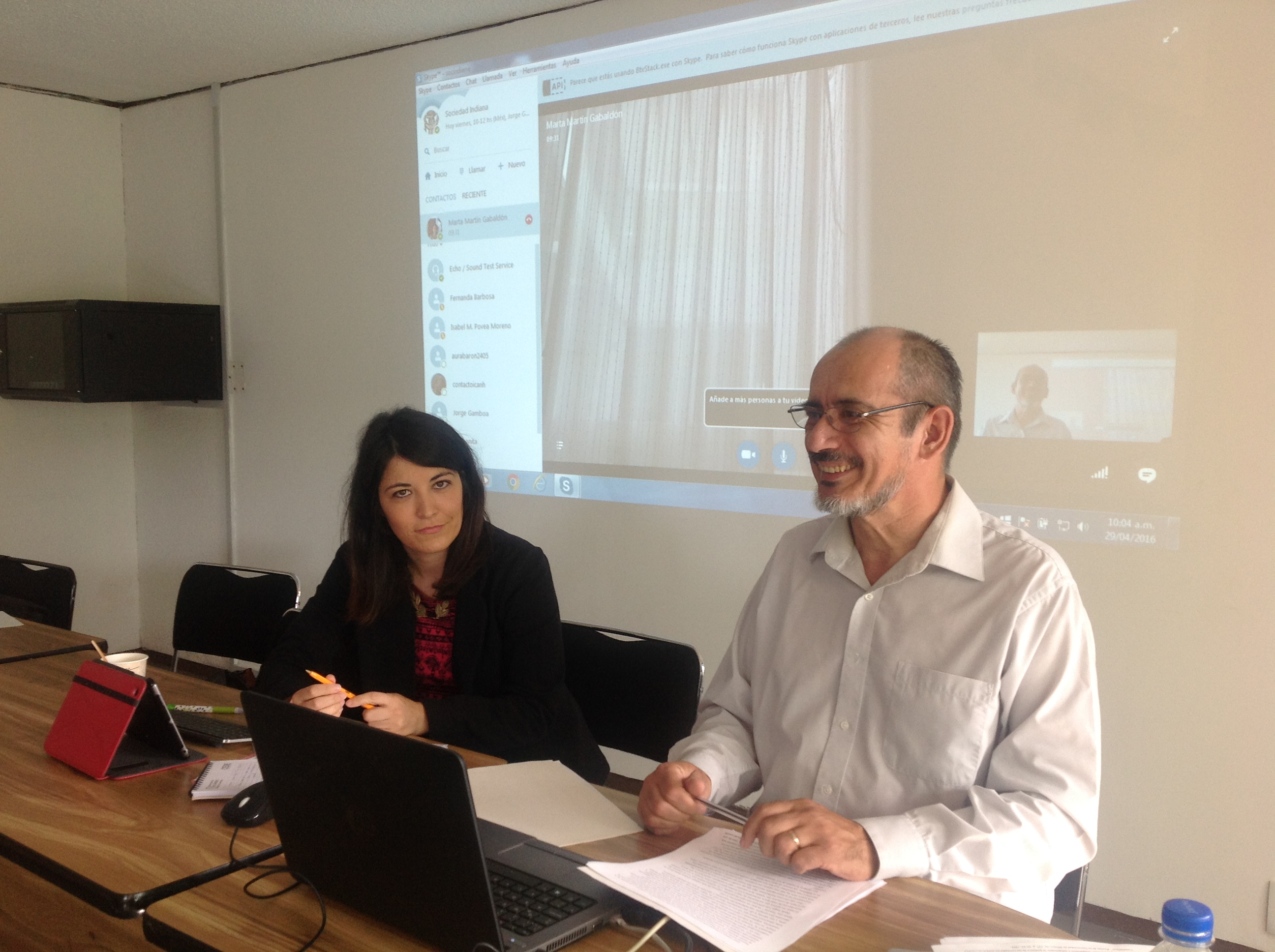
Isabel María Povea Moreno & Felipe Castro Gutiérrez (April 29, 2016)

Since July 2015, together with Felipe Castro Gutiérrez, she has organized and coordinated the seminar and blog Sociedad Indiana. Historia social de los mundos indianos which is hosted by the Instituto de Investigaciones Históricas of the Universidad Nacional Autónoma de México. The seminar has a monthly periodicity and the first session was held on January 29, 2016, with the presentation of Brígida von Mentz. The seminar's blog publishes announcements, essays, book reviews, and bibliographies. The seminar has published two books. The first, Los oficios en Hispanomérica colonial, is an outreach text of collective participation published by the Red Universitaria de Aprendizaje de la UNAM in 2019. The second book, Los oficios en las sociedades indianas, is the product of the colloquium "Los oficios en las sociedades indians" that took place on October 24 and 25, 2018.The book was published in 2020 and the publisher is the Instituto de Investigaciones Históricas de la UNAM. A hemerography or compilation of scientific articles related to indigenous social history is published in the seminar's blog (2015–2022).

== Bibliography ==
=== Books ===
- Povea Moreno, Isabel María (2014). Minería y reformismo borbónico en el Perú. Estado, empresa y trabajadores en Huancavelica, 1784-1814 (in Spanish). Lima, Peru: Instituto de Estudios Peruanos & Banco Central de Reserva del Perú. ISBN 978-9972-51-484-5. OCLC 934602129.

=== Edited books ===
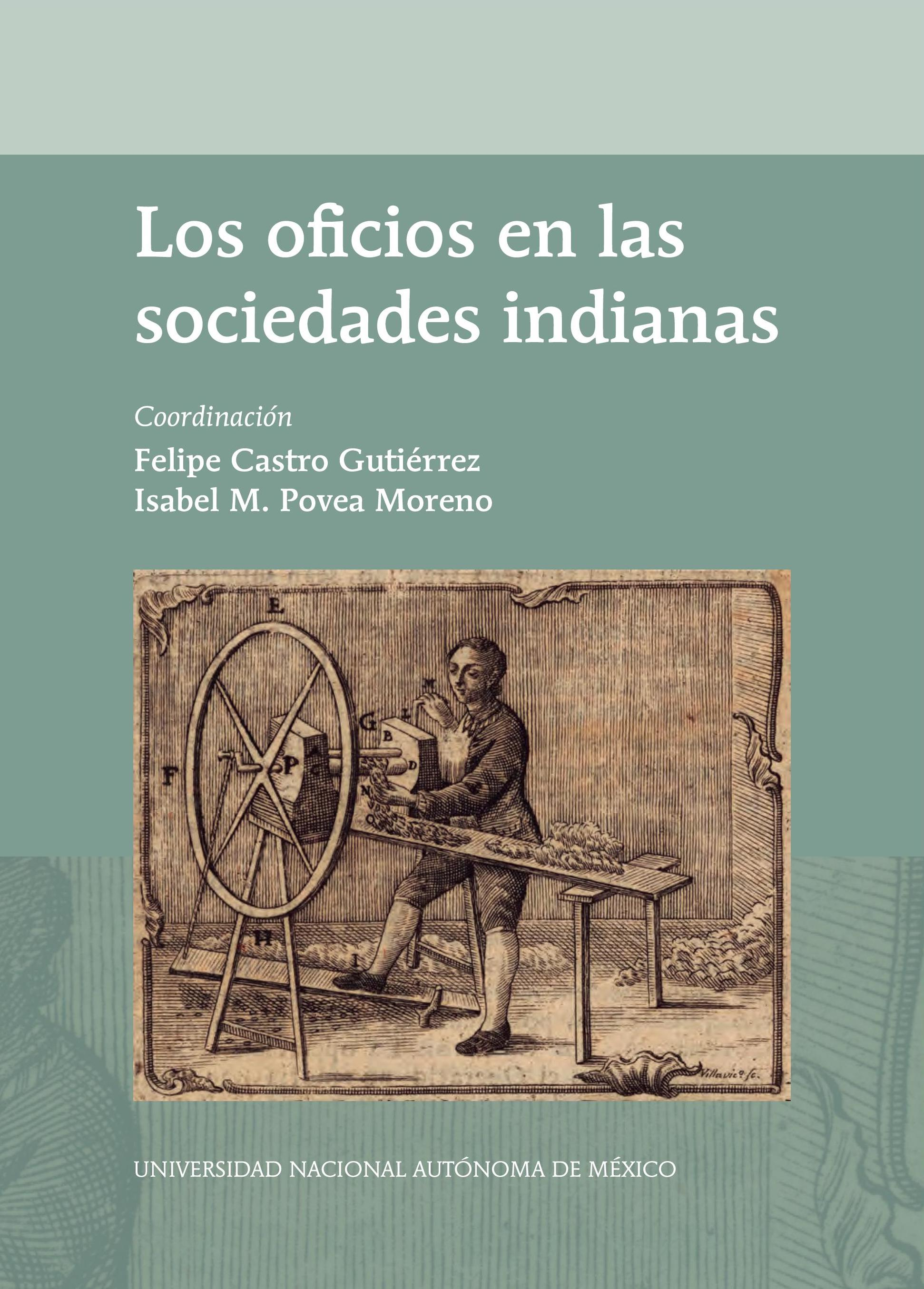
Los oficios en las sociedades indianas (2020)

- Povea Moreno, Isabel María; Castro Gutiérrez, Felipe, eds. (2020). Los oficios en las sociedades indianas (in Spanish). Mexico: Universidad Nacional Autónoma de México. ISBN 978-607-30-3381-7. OCLC 1334752684.
- Povea Moreno, Isabel María; Castro Gutiérrez, Felipe, eds. (2019). Los oficios en Hispanoamérica colonial (in Spanish). Mexico: Universidad Nacional Autónoma de México.

=== Book chapters ===
- Povea Moreno, Isabel María (2023). "Trabajar en un "oscuro abismo". Formas de captación y remuneración de los trabajadores en la minería de la América española, siglo XVIII". In Mazín, Óscar; Bautista y Lugo, Gibrán (eds.). El espejo de las Indias Occidentales. Un mundo de mundos: interacción y reciprocidades. Mexico: El Colegio de México & Universidad Nacional Autónoma de México. ISBN 978-607-564-483-7. OCLC 1391130419.
- Povea Moreno, Isabel María; Musotti, Sara (2023). "Historia de las mujeres y de género en el noroeste de Nueva España y México: un balance historiográfico (1990-2020)". In Méndez Medina, Diana Lizbeth; Musotti, Sara (eds.). Tendencias en la historiografía bajacaliforniana del siglo XXI (PDF) (in Spanish). Mexicali, Baja California: Universidad Autónoma de Baja California. ISBN 978-607-607-813-6.
- Povea Moreno, Isabel María; Zagalsky, Paula (2022). "A diverse world: A panoramic view of colonial mine labourers based on case studies from the viceroyalties of New Spain and Peru". In Revilla Orías, Paola; Cruz terra, Paulo; De Vito, Christian G. (eds.). Worlds of Labour in Latin America. Berlin: The Gruyter Oldenburg. pp. 11–40. doi:10.1515/9783110759303-002. ISBN 9783110759303. OCLC 1294426124. S2CID 246256649.
- Povea Moreno, Isabel María (2020). "'No se les pida ni lleve tributo'. Trabajadores mulatos e indígenas del Real de Tlalpujahua y la re-imposición del tributo a finales del siglo XVIII". In Castañeda García, Rafael; Ruiz Guadalajara, Juan Carlos (eds.). Africanos y afrodescendientes en la América hispánica septentrional. Espacios de convivencia, sociabilidad y conflicto. El Colegio de San Luis. ISBN 9786078666744. OCLC 1302894892.

=== Articles ===
A complete list of refereed scientific articles can be found in the historian's personal profile on Google Scholar.

- Povea, Isabel María (2025). "Mujeres jefas de hogar en un real minero: Santa María de Charcas (virreinato de Nueva España), a finales del siglo XVIII". Signos Historicos (in Spanish). 27 (53): 1–40. doi:10.5281/zenodo.18601306. Wikidata Q138111825.
- Povea, Isabel María (2025). "Viudas, tutoras y minería: la experiencia de Josefa Gertrudis Nieto Téllez-Girón en San Luis Potosí, segunda mitad del siglo XVIII". Estudios de Historia Moderna y Contemporánea de México (in Spanish) (1e): 50–79. doi:10.22201/iih.24485004e.2025.1e.77964. S2CID 278655167. Wikidata Q136387300.
- María Concepción Gavira Márquez; Povea, Isabel María (2023). "Mercurio y minería en la América española: El consumo de azogue en Oruro a fines del siglo XVIII". Revista Metalúrgica (in Spanish) (52): 60–70. doi:10.5281/zenodo.10408345. Wikidata Q123924000.
- Povea, Isabel María (2023). "Pequeños productores mineros en el universo de reales de minas de la alcaldía mayor de Charcas, 1700-1779". Naveg@mérica. Revista electrónica editada por la Asociación Española de Americanistas (in Spanish) (31). doi:10.6018/nav.586051. Wikidata Q122961861.
- Povea, Isabel María (2023). "Dejadas entre renglones. Mujeres, niñas y niños en la minería de Hispanoamérica colonial, una aproximación. Balance historiográfico y perspectivas". Trashumante: Revista Americana de Historia Social (in Spanish and English) (21): 174–197, 174-197. doi:10.17533/udea.trahs.n21a08. Wikidata Q116225132.
- Povea, Isabel María (2022). "El papel de las viudas en los negocios mineros del virreinato de la Nueva España, siglo XVIII: Propiedad, legislación y estrategias". Americanía: Revista de Estudios Latinoamericanos (in Spanish) (16): 63–94, 63-94. doi:10.46661/americania.7339. Wikidata Q116155157.
- Povea, Isabel María (2020). "Mujeres y minería en la América colonial: una introducción". Chronica Nova. Revista de Historia Moderna de la Universidad de Granada (in Spanish) (46): 11–20. doi:10.30827/cnova.v0i46.16336. Wikidata Q114983395.
- Povea, Isabel María (2020). "Mineras y parcioneras. La participación de las mujeres en la minería de San Luis Potosí, una aproximación a través de los pleitos, siglo XVIII". Chronica Nova. Revista de Historia Moderna de la Universidad de Granada (in Spanish) (46): 53–82. doi:10.30827/cnova.v0i46.15195. Wikidata Q114869494.
- Povea, Isabel María (2019). "Una mirada sobre las masculinidades en los reales mineros del México virreinal: Zacatecas, siglo XVIII". Revista de Humanidades (in Spanish) (36): 109. doi:10.5944/rdh.36.2019.23046. Wikidata Q114983396.
- Povea, Isabel María (2018). "Conflictos y negociaciones. La defensa de los arreglos laborales tradicionales por parte de los trabajadores mineros de Nueva España, segunda mitad del siglo XVIII". Tiempos Modernos (in Spanish). 9 (37): 234–257. ISSN 1699-7778. Wikidata Q116196389..
- Povea, Isabel María (2017). "Ante la justicia Real. Conflictos entre los propietarios mineros de San Luis Potosí, 1700-1783". Revista Historia y Justicia (in Spanish) (9). doi:10.4000/rhj.1216. Wikidata Q114983397.
- Povea, Isabel María (2017). "Los juegos de azar en los reales mineros novohispanos y el papel de las autoridades civiles : el caso de Zimapán a finales del siglo XVIII". Nuevo Mundo, Mundos Nuevos. doi:10.4000/nuevomundo.71241. Wikidata Q114983401.
- Povea, Isabel María; Rafael Castañeda García (2017). "Los espacios de la picaresca. Teatro, juegos y otras diversiones en los reales mineros novohispanos". Nuevo Mundo, Mundos Nuevos. doi:10.4000/nuevomundo.71227. Wikidata Q114983400.
- Povea, Isabel María; Paula C. Zagalsky (2017). "Presentación dossier "Conflictos y violencia en los distritos mineros de la América española (siglos XVI-XVIII)"". Revista Historia y Justicia (in Spanish) (9). doi:10.4000/rhj.1117. Wikidata Q114983398.
- Povea, Isabel María; Fagoaga, Ricardo Alejandro (2017). "Escribir la historia de México colonial con herramientas digitales: medios digitales, experiencias y debates". Les Melanges de la Casa de Velazquez (47–2): 285–289. doi:10.4000/mcv.7915. Wikidata Q114983399.
- Povea, Isabel María (2015). "Coacción y disensión. Protestas frente a los repartimientos mineros en Perú y Nueva España, siglo xviii". Estudios de historia novohispana (in Spanish). 53: 1–17. doi:10.1016/j.ehn.2015.06.002. S2CID 222520822. Wikidata Q114869244.
