= Elena Nevado =

Spanish politician and MEP

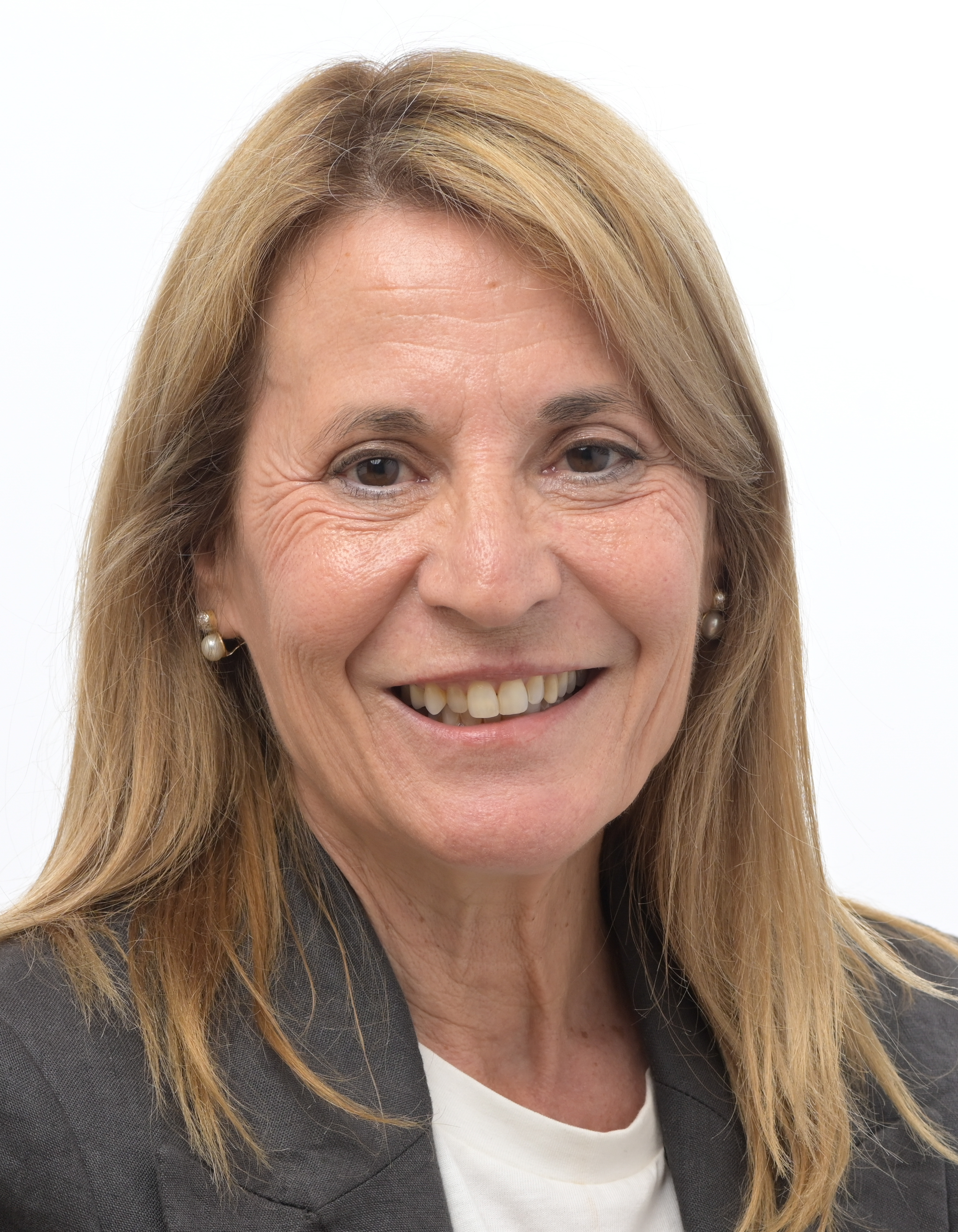

Mayor of Cáceres
- In office 11 June 2011 – 15 June 2019
- Preceded by: Carmen Heras
- Succeeded by: Luis Salaya

Senator
- In office 13 December 2011 – 12 June 2015
- Constituency: Cáceres

Member of the Assembly of Extremadura
- In office 18 June 2019 – 28 June 2024
- Constituency: Cáceres

Member of the European Parliament
- Incumbent
- Assumed office 16 July 2024
- Constituency: Spain

Personal details
- Born: 26 January 1967 (age 59) Cáceres, Extremadura, Spain
- Party: People's Party
- Education: University of Extremadura
- Profession: Lawyer

María Elena Nevado del Campo (Spanish pronunciation: [eˈlena neˈβaðo]; born 26 January 1967) is a Spanish politician of the People's Party (PP). She was a member of the city council of Cáceres from 2007 to 2015, serving as mayor from 2011. She was also a senator from 2011 to 2015, a member of the Assembly of Extremadura from 2019 to 2024, and was elected to the European Parliament in 2024.

== Early life and career ==
Nevado was born in Cáceres in Extremadura. Her younger sister Magdalena is also a politician, who was elected to the Congress of Deputies representing Vox in 2019. She has two daughters.

Nevado graduated with a law degree from the University of Extremadura and obtained a master's degree in business legal advice. She was the vice dean of the Illustrious School of Lawyers in Cáceres.

== Political career ==
=== Mayor, senator and regional deputy, 2007–2024 ===
Nevado was first elected to her hometown's city council in 2007. In 2011, she ran for mayor and won an absolute majority for the PP, taking the leadership from the Spanish Socialist Workers' Party (PSOE) candidate Carmen Heras after an election in which five of the six lead candidates were women. She was elected to the Senate of Spain in 2011 for the Cáceres constituency; amid controversy over holding both offices, she took the lower salary from the senate and a far reduced salary for the basics of being mayor. In the 2015 local elections, she lost her absolute majority and was sworn in for a second term in coalition with Citizens (Cs), on condition that she leave the senate.

Nevado declined to run for a third term as mayor in 2019. She was put in 6th place on the PP list in the Cáceres constituency for the 2019 Extremaduran regional election. Her party took 20 seats in the Assembly of Extremadura, remaining in opposition to the PSOE. She left her regional seat when she was elected in the 2024 European Parliament election in Spain.

=== Member of the European Parliament, 2024–present ===
Nevado was placed 20th on the PP list for the 2024 European Parliament election in Spain. The party said that Nevado would represent Extremaduran interests in the European Parliament, including the countryside, railways and the Almaraz Nuclear Power Plant. While Spain is one constituency in the European Parliament, the PP was the most voted party in Extremadura for the first time in such elections, up over 15 percentage points. She was one of two residents of the region to be elected, the other being incumbent PSOE member Nacho Sánchez Amor.

In parliament, Nevado has since been serving on the Committee on Regional Development and the Subcommittee on Public Health. In addition to her committee assignments, she is part of the parliament's delegation for relations with the countries of Central America.
