= María Teresa Rejas =

Spanish teacher and politician (born 1946)

President of the Extremaduran Assembly
- In office 20 June 1995 – 25 September 1997
- President: Juan Carlos Rodríguez Ibarra
- Preceded by: Antonio Vázquez López
- Succeeded by: Manuel Veiga López

Member of the Assembly of Extremadura
- In office 1991–2007
- Constituency: Badajoz (1991–2003); Cáceres (2003–2007)

Personal details
- Born: 29 July 1946 (age 80) Cáceres, Extremadura, Spain
- Party: Communist Party of Spain; United Left
- Education: University of Extremadura

María Teresa Rejas Rodríguez (born 29 July 1946) is a Spanish teacher and politician who served in the Assembly of Extremadura from 1991 until 2007. A member of the Communist Party of Spain and the United Left, Rejas was the first female president of the assembly, holding the position as part of a coalition agreement from 1995 to 1997.

== Biography ==
María Teresa Rejas Rodríguez was born on 29 July 1946 in Cáceres, Extremadura. She graduated from the University of Extremadura with a degree in philology. Rejas worked as a teacher specializing in Spanish and French, and was also a therapeutic pedagogue. She is affiliated with the Workers' Commissions trade union.

Rejas was elected to the Assembly of Extremadura following the 1991 Extremaduran regional election. A member of the United Left, she represented the Badajoz constituency for most of her tenure, switching to the Cáceres constituency during her final term in office. Throughout her tenure, Rejas served on several committees, including the committees on finance; culture, youth, and women; and education. Following the 1995 Extremaduran regional election, the incumbent Spanish Socialist Workers' Party narrowly lost their majority in the assembly; as part of a coalition agreement between the PSOE and the United Left, Rejas was selected to serve as president of the assembly, becoming the first woman to preside over the assembly. She resigned from the presidency on 25 September 1997 following the collapse of the coalition. Rejas remained in the assembly until the end of her term in 2007.

In addition to her parliamentary tenure, Rejas held various party positions, including positions on the United Left's national presidency and regional political council. She also served as the parliamentary spokesman for the United Left Extremadura from 2003 until 2007. Rejas joined the Communist Party of Spain, a faction within the United Left, in 1996.

In 2011, the Cáceres City Council awarded Rejas with the Juanita Elguezábal prize, which is given to women who pioneer in fields in which they "have not been culturally represented".
