= Minería y reformismo borbónico en el Perú =

Book about the social history of mining in Peru

Minería y reformismo borbónico en el Perú. Estado, empresa y trabajadores en Huancavelica, 1784-1814
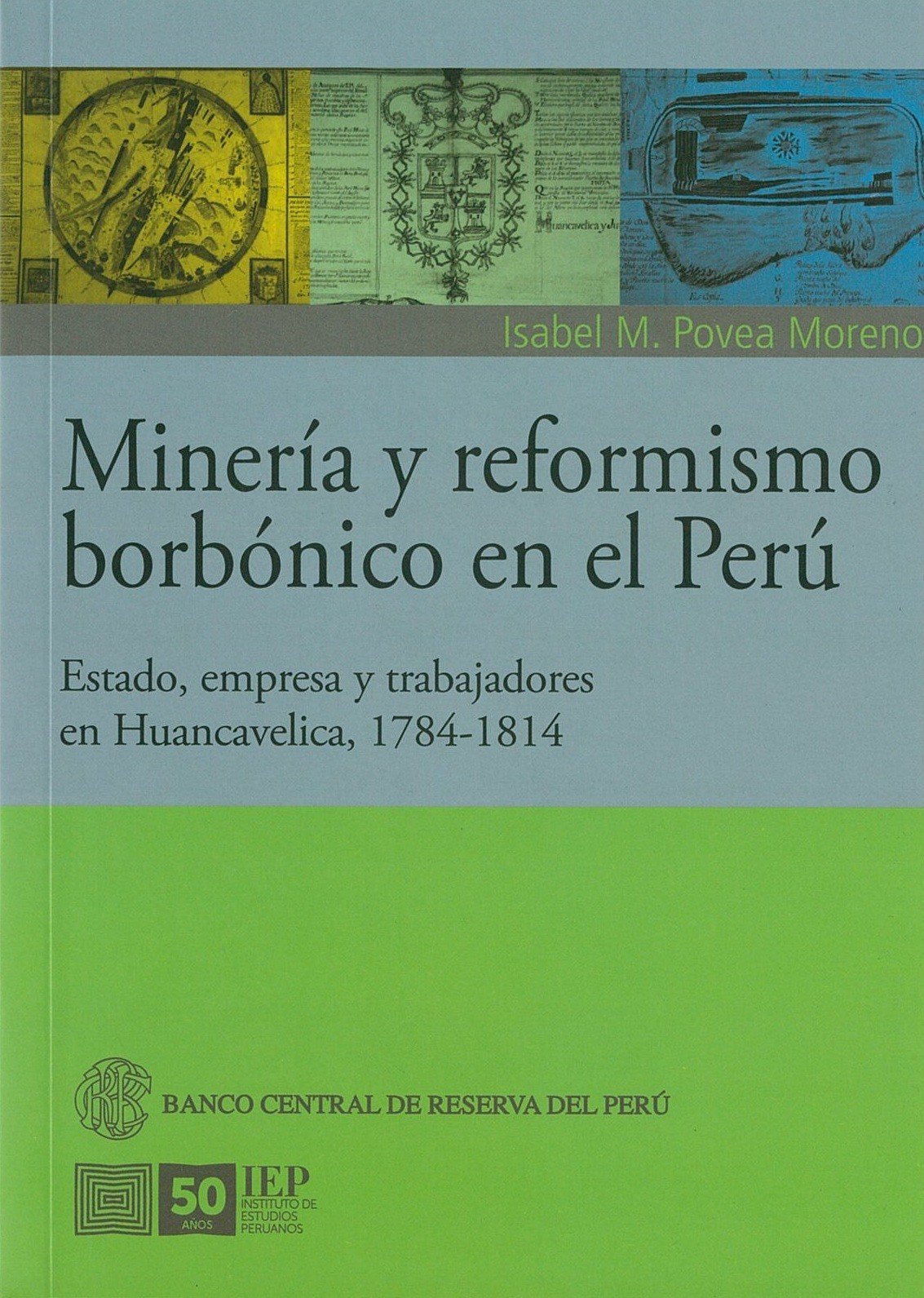
- Author: Isabel María Povea Moreno
- Language: Spanish
- Genres: Social History, History of Mining
- Publisher: Instituto de Estudios Peruanos & Banco Central de Reserva del Perú
- Publication date: 2014
- Publication place: Peru
- ISBN: 978-612-326-106-1

Minería y reformismo borbónico en el Perú. Estado, empresa y trabajadores en Huancavelica, 1784-1814 is a book on the social history of mining in Huancavelica by Spanish historian Isabel María Povea Moreno. It was published in 2014 in Lima by the Banco Central de Reserva del Perú and the Instituto de Estudios Peruanos (IEP). The book is based on the doctoral research that Povea Moreno defended at the University of Granada in 2012. This book analyses the impact of the Bourbon Reforms in Huancavelica and the transformations of the mining exploitation model between 1784 and 1814.

The great novelty of the book, according to historian Miguel Molina Martínez, is the "analysis it devotes to the role played by women in the workings of the mine, advancing a suggestive line of research". In 2015, the book was considered one of the 10 best books on Peruvian history published in 2014 and ranked 5th, according to a survey of 35 Peruvian and foreign historians by the blog El Reportero de la Historia.

== Summary ==
The book examines state policy towards mining and how the Huancavelica mining company adapted to the Bourbon reforms. It also analyses the situation of the workers, their role in mercury production and their living and working conditions. The author highlights the role of the workers in the resistance to the Bourbon reforms, which affected their rights and working conditions.

In addition, the book also analyses the relationship between mining and the environment, and how the exploitation of mineral resources had a significant impact on the Huancavelica region. The author argues that mining in Huancavelica was a complex social, political and economic process that affected society as a whole.

In summary, the book Minería y reformismo borbónico en el Perú is a comprehensive study of the history of mining in Huancavelica during the period of the Bourbon reforms in Peru, and offers a critical perspective on the relationship between the company, the state and the workers in this historical context.
