= Consuelo Rodríguez Píriz =

Spanish politician (1960–2021)

María del Consuelo de Fátima Rodríguez Píriz (1960 – 22 February 2021) was a Spanish politician from the conservative People's Party and member of the Assembly of Extremadura between 2011 and her death in 2021.

== Biography ==
Rodríguez was born in Olivenza in 1960, province of Badajoz and got a degree in Psychology from the University of Granada and a diploma in Hearing and Language from the University of Extremadura. Between 1999 and 2011 she was city councilor of Badajoz, occupying the departments of Culture, Fairs and Festivals. In the 2011 Extremaduran regional election she got elected deputy of the Assembly of Extremadura, office she held until her death. She was also the first vice president of the Autonomous Chamber between 2011 and 2015.

At the end of January 2021, she was admitted to the Badajoz University Hospital affected by COVID-19 during the COVID-19 pandemic in Spain. She died three weeks later on 22 February, at the age of 60, being the first Spanish legislator in office to die from the virus.
