= Blanca Martín =

Spanish politician (born 1976)

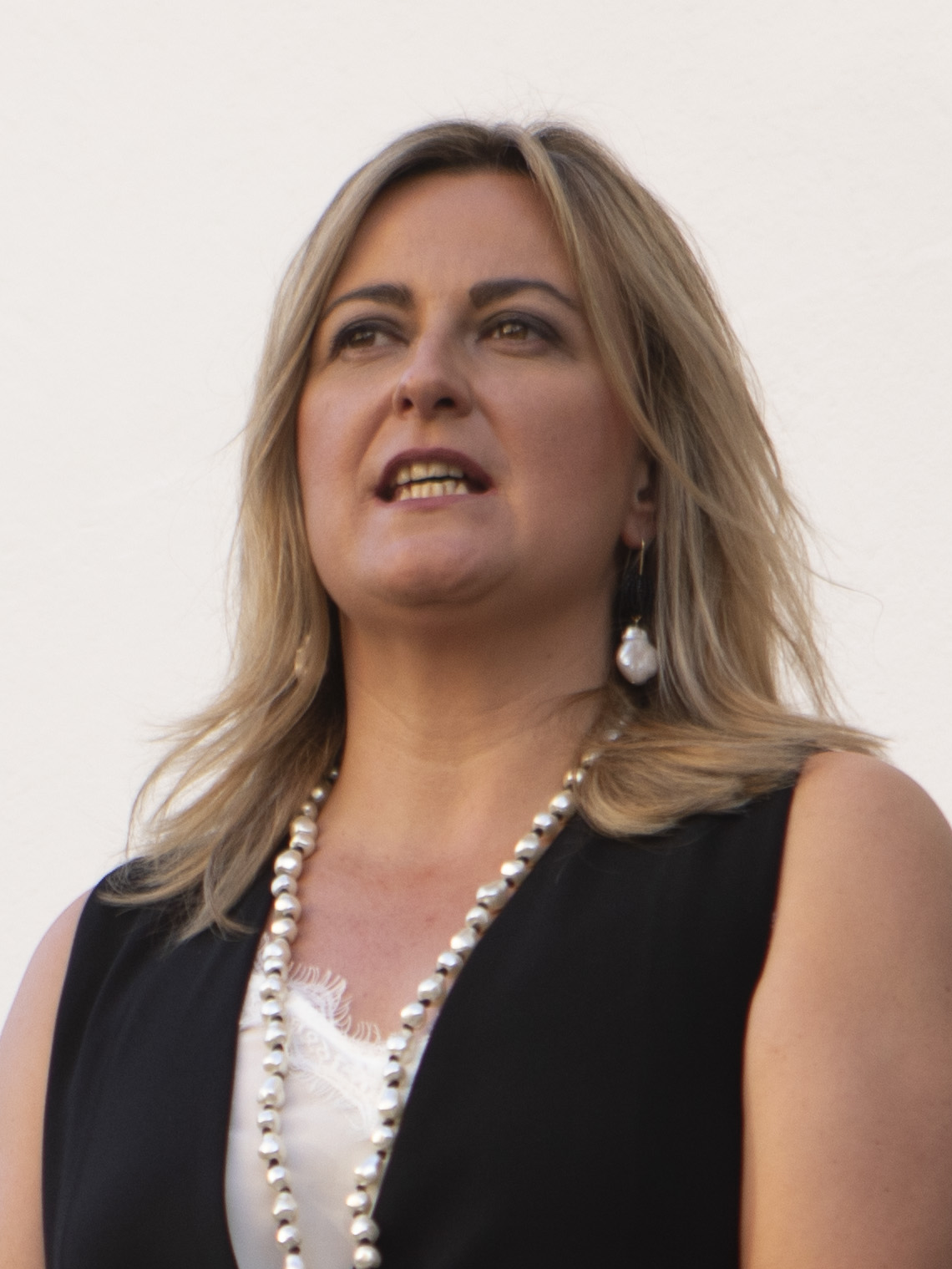
- Martín in 2019

President of the Assembly of Extremadura
- In office 23 June 2015 – 20 January 2026
- Preceded by: Fernando Manzano
- Succeeded by: Manuel Naharro

Personal details
- Born: 2 March 1976 (age 50)
- Party: Spanish Socialist Workers' Party

Blanca Martín Delgado (born 2 March 1976) is a Spanish politician who served as president of the Assembly of Extremadura from 2015 to 2026. From 2021 to 2024, she served as president of the Spanish Socialist Workers' Party of Extremadura.
