= María J. Carro =

Spanish mathematician (born 1961)

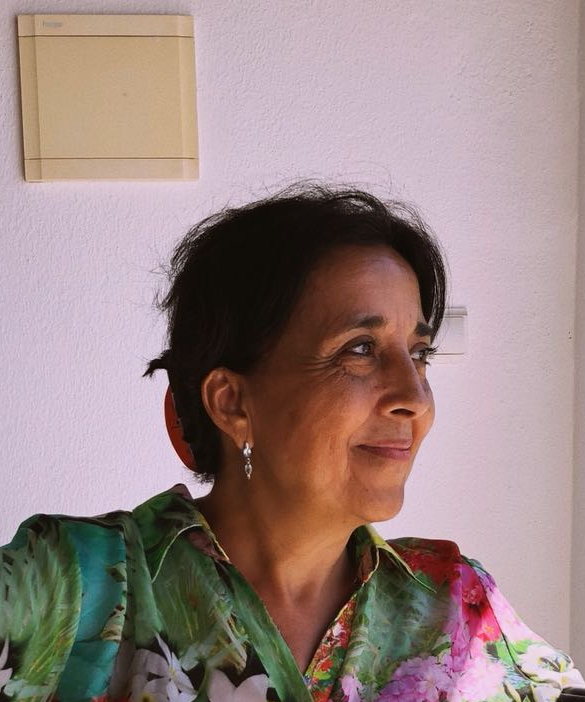
María Jesús Carro Rossell

María Jesús Carro Rossell (born 1961) is a Spanish mathematician specializing in mathematical analysis, including Fourier analysis, functional analysis, harmonic analysis, operator theory and the analysis of Lorentz spaces. She is a professor at the Complutense University of Madrid, in the Department of Mathematical Analysis and Applied Mathematics.

== Education and career ==
Carro was born in 1961, and motivated to work in mathematics by her father, who was prevented from studying science by the Spanish Civil War. She earned a degree in mathematical sciences in 1984 from the University of Extremadura. Next, she went to the University of Barcelona for doctoral study in mathematics, completing her Ph.D. in 1988 under the supervision of Joan Cerdà, with the dissertation Interpolación compleja de operadores lineales.

After postdoctoral study at Washington University in St. Louis with Guido Weiss, she obtained a faculty position at the Autonomous University of Barcelona in 1991, and then returned to the University of Barcelona in 1992. There, she held a professorial chair from 1993 to 2019, when she moved to the Complutense University of Madrid.

== Recognition ==
Carro received the medal of the Royal Spanish Mathematical Society in 2020. She was elected as a corresponding member of the Spanish Royal Academy of Sciences in 2021.
