= Valle de Matamoros =

Coordinates: 38°23′N 06°48′W

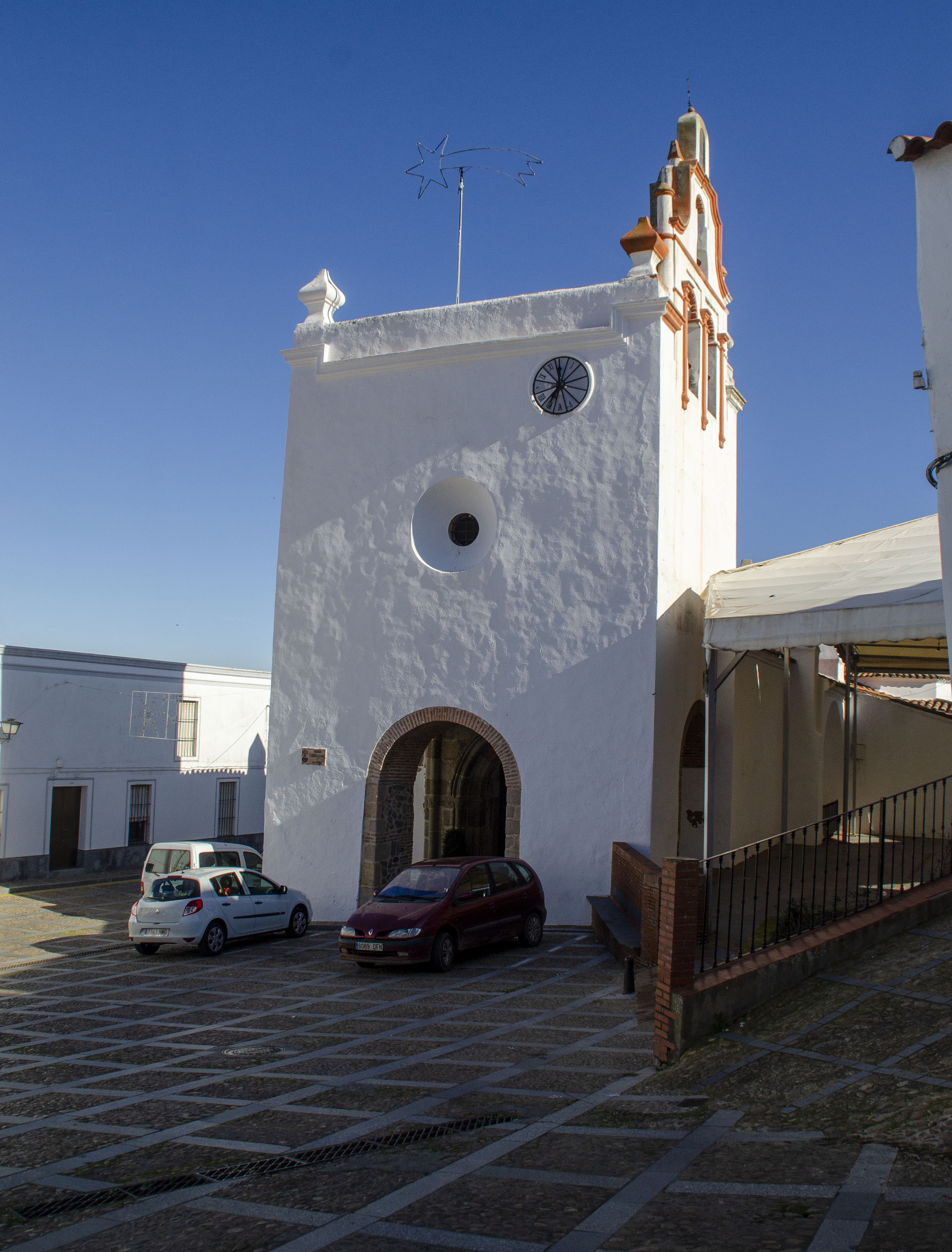
- Church in Valle de Matamoros

- Coat of arms
- Interactive map of Valle de Matamoros
- Country: Spain
- Autonomous community: Extremadura
- Province: Badajoz
- Comarca: Sierra Suroeste

Government
  - Alcaldesa: Manuela Borrachero Carrasco

Area
  - Total: 4.9 km^{2} (1.9 sq mi)
- Elevation: 609 m (1,998 ft)

Population (2025-01-01)
  - Total: 337
- Time zone: UTC+1 (CET)
  - Summer (DST): UTC+2 (CEST)
- Website: Ayuntamiento de Valle de Matamoros

Valle de Matamoros is a Spanish municipality in the province of Badajoz, Extremadura. It has a population of 442 (2007) and an area of 4.9 km^{2}.

== See also ==
- List of municipalities in Badajoz
