= List of presidents of the Assembly of Extremadura =

President of the Assembly of Extremadura
- Presidente de la Asamblea de Extremadura
- Flag of Extremadura
- Incumbent; Manuel Naharro since 20 January 2026
- Member of: Assembly of Extremadura
- Formation: 5 March 1983
- First holder: Pablo Castellano

This article lists the presidents of the Assembly of Extremadura, the regional legislature of Extremadura.

== Presidents ==
^{No.}	Name	Portrait	Party	Took office	Left office	^{Legs.}	^{Refs.}
1	Pablo Castellano		Spanish Socialist Workers'; Party of Extremadura	5 March 1983	21 May 1983	Prov.	
2	Antonio Vázquez		Spanish Socialist Workers'; Party of Extremadura	21 May 1983	20 June 1987	1st	
2	Antonio Vázquez		Spanish Socialist Workers'; Party of Extremadura	21 May 1987	20 June 1991	2nd	
2	Antonio Vázquez		Spanish Socialist Workers'; Party of Extremadura	21 May 1991	20 June 1995	3rd	
3	María Teresa Rejas		United Left Extremadura	20 June 1995	25 September 1997	4th	
4	Manuel Veiga		Spanish Socialist Workers'; Party of Extremadura	25 September 1997	1999	4th	
4	Manuel Veiga		Spanish Socialist Workers'; Party of Extremadura	21 May 1999	17 June 2003	5th	
5	Federico Suárez		Spanish Socialist Workers'; Party of Extremadura	17 June 2003	19 June 2007	6th	
6	Juan Ramón Ferreira		Spanish Socialist Workers'; Party of Extremadura	19 June 2007	21 June 2011	7th	
7	Fernando Manzano		People's Party of Extremadura	21 June 2011	23 June 2015	8th	
8	Blanca Martín		Spanish Socialist Workers'; Party of Extremadura	23 June 2015	18 June 2019	9th	
8	Blanca Martín		Spanish Socialist Workers'; Party of Extremadura	18 June 2019	20 June 2023	10th	
8	Blanca Martín		Spanish Socialist Workers'; Party of Extremadura	20 June 2023	20 January 2026	11th	
9	Manuel Naharro		People's Party of Extremadura	20 January 2026		12th	
