= Juan Pizarro (politician) =

Spanish physician and politician (1945–2022)

Member of the Parliament of Andalusia
- In office 2000–2012
- Constituency: Jaén

Mayor of Úbeda
- In office 2003–2007
- Preceded by: Marcelino Sanchez Ruiz
- Succeeded by: Marcelino Sanchez Ruiz
- In office 1995–1999
- Preceded by: Juan Jose Perez Padilla
- Succeeded by: Marcelino Sanchez Ruiz

Member of the Jaén Provincial Council
- In office 1995–2000

Member of the Congress of Deputies
- In office 6 March 1991 – 13 April 1993
- Preceded by: Ramiro Rivera López
- Constituency: Jaén

Personal details
- Born: October 1945 Salvaleón, Extremadura, Spain
- Died: 7 November 2022 (aged 77)
- Party: People's Party (after 1989); People's Alliance (1982–1989)
- Children: 3
- Education: Complutense University of Madrid; University of Salamanca; University of Granada

Juan Pizarro Navarrete (October 1945 – 7 November 2022) was a Spanish physician and politician from the region of Andalusia. A member of the People's Party, Pizarro represented the Province of Jaén in the Congress of Deputies from 1991 until 1993 and in the Parliament of Andalusia from 2000 until 2012. Pizarro also served as mayor of Úbeda from 1995 to 1999 and from 2003 to 2007.

== Biography ==
Juan Pizarro Navarrete was born in October 1945 in the town of Salvaleón, Extremadura. Pizarro completed his baccalaureate with the Salesians in Mérida and later studied medicine at the Complutense University of Madrid, the University of Salamanca, and the University of Granada, graduating with a degree in orthopedic surgery and traumatology from the latter. After graduating, Pizarro began working at the hospital in the town of Úbeda in Andalusia, becoming the hospital's head of traumatology and orthopedics.

In 1982, Pizarro joined the People's Alliance, and unsuccessfully ran for the Congress of Deputies in the 1986 Spanish general election. He again ran for Congress in the 1989 Spanish general election with the newly-formed People's Party, though he was again defeated. However, Pizarro was appointed to Congress on 6 March 1991, following the resignation of Ramiro Rivera López. Pizarro represented the Jaén constituency. While in Congress, Pizarro was a member of the Defense Commission and the Social and Employment Policy Commission. He left Congress at the end of his term in 1993.

In 1995, Pizarro was elected mayor of Úbeda and to the Jaén Provincial Council. He served one term as mayor until 1999, and served on the council until 2000, when he was elected to the Parliament of Andalusia in the 2000 Andalusian regional election, representing the Jaén constituency. Pizarro was re-elected in 2004 and 2008. From 2000 until 2004, he served as the People's Party health spokesman in parliament and as vice president of the Governance Commission, and from 2004 until 2012, he served as vice president of the Infrastructure, Public Works, and Territory Organization Commission. In 2003, Pizarro was also elected to a second term as mayor of Úbeda, serving until 2007; during his tenure, Úbeda was declared a UNESCO World Heritage Site. He did not seek re-election to parliament in the 2012 Andalusian regional election and retired.

During his political career, Pizarro was a high-ranking member of the People's Party of Andalusia. He served as the party's regional secretary and was a member of the regional board of directors. He had also served as vice president of the People's Party of Jaén, and was the president of the People's Party of Úbeda from 1984 until 2009.

Pizarro died of cancer on 7 November 2022, at age 77. His death was commemorated by Antonia Olivares, the mayor of Úbeda. Olivares, a member of the Spanish Socialist Workers' Party, had served as a spokesman for her party in 1999, while Pizarro was a spokesman for the People's Party; despite being from opposing parties, Olivares stated that Pizarro "worked in a committed manner to improve the city" and that he "liked to give advice if you wanted to take it". The Úbeda City Council stated that Pizarro's death was an "irreparable loss" to the community.
