= Fernando Manzano =

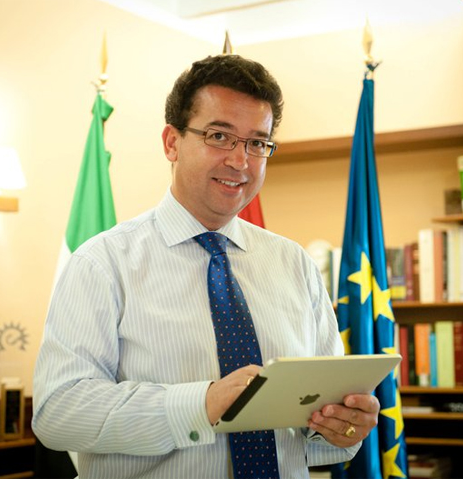

Fernando Jesús Manzano Pedrera (born 3 June 1969) is a Spanish politician of the People's Party (PP). He was a member of the Assembly of Extremadura from 2011 to 2023, serving as president of the legislature for the first four years and second vice president for the remainder.

== Biography ==
Born in Cáceres in Extremadura, Manzano was raised in the nearby small town of Malpartida de Cáceres. He was elected to its council in 1999 and became deputy mayor in 2007, and in 2003 he was elected to the provincial deputation. In 2008, he became secretary general of the People's Party of Extremadura, when José Antonio Monago became the group's president.

In the 2011 Extremaduran regional election, Monago and Manzano led the PP lists in the Badajoz and Cáceres constituencies, respectively. The PP won 32 seats, the Spanish Socialist Workers' Party (PSOE) 30, and the United Left (IU) three; due to the IU's abstention, Monago was elected President of the Regional Government of Extremadura, and Manzano President of the Assembly of Extremadura, the role of speaker. In the 28th year of the Assembly of Extremadura, he was its first president from the PP or any other party on the right; this would not repeat until 2026 and the election of Manuel Naharro.

Manzano again led the PP list in Cáceres in the 2015 Extremaduran regional election. The PSOE candidate Blanca Martín succeeded him as president of the legislature with the support of Citizens (Cs), and he was second vice president. In 2019, he led the list for a third time, and retained his position behind Martín.

In April 2023, Manzano was awarded the Medal of Honour of the Association of Victims of Terrorism.

For the 2023 Extremaduran regional election, PP candidate for president María Guardiola led a list comprising new names for 80%, in which Manzano did not feature. As president, Guardiola named Manzano as secretary general for the interior, emergencies and civil protection in her government.
