= Oliva de la Frontera =

- municipality
- Coat of arms

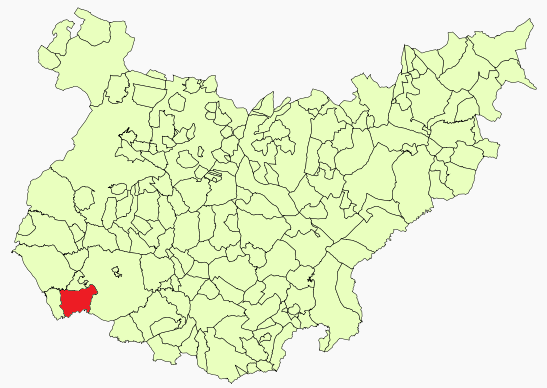
- Location in Badajoz

- Location of Oliva de la Frontera within Extremadura
- Coordinates: 38°16′35″N 6°55′12″W
- Country: Spain
- Autonomous community: Extremadura
- Province: Badajoz

Area
  - Total: 149.3 km^{2} (57.6 sq mi)
- Elevation: 373 m (1,224 ft)

Population (2025-01-01)
  - Total: 4,907
  - Density: 32.87/km^{2} (85.12/sq mi)
- Time zone: UTC+1 (CET)
  - Summer (DST): UTC+2 (CEST)

Oliva de la Frontera is a municipality located in the province of Badajoz, Extremadura, Spain. According to the 2006 census (INE), the municipality has a population of 5881 inhabitants.

== See also ==
- List of municipalities in Badajoz
