= Salvatierra de los Barros =

Coordinates: 38°29′28″N 6°41′7″W

- Coat of arms

- Location in Spain.
- Country: Spain
- Autonomous community: Badajoz

Area
  - Total: 75 km^{2} (29 sq mi)
- Elevation: 620 m (2,030 ft)

Population (2025-01-01)
  - Total: 1,546
  - Density: 21/km^{2} (53/sq mi)
- Time zone: UTC+1 (CET)
  - Summer (DST): UTC+2 (CEST)
- Website: http://www.salvatierradelosbarros.com

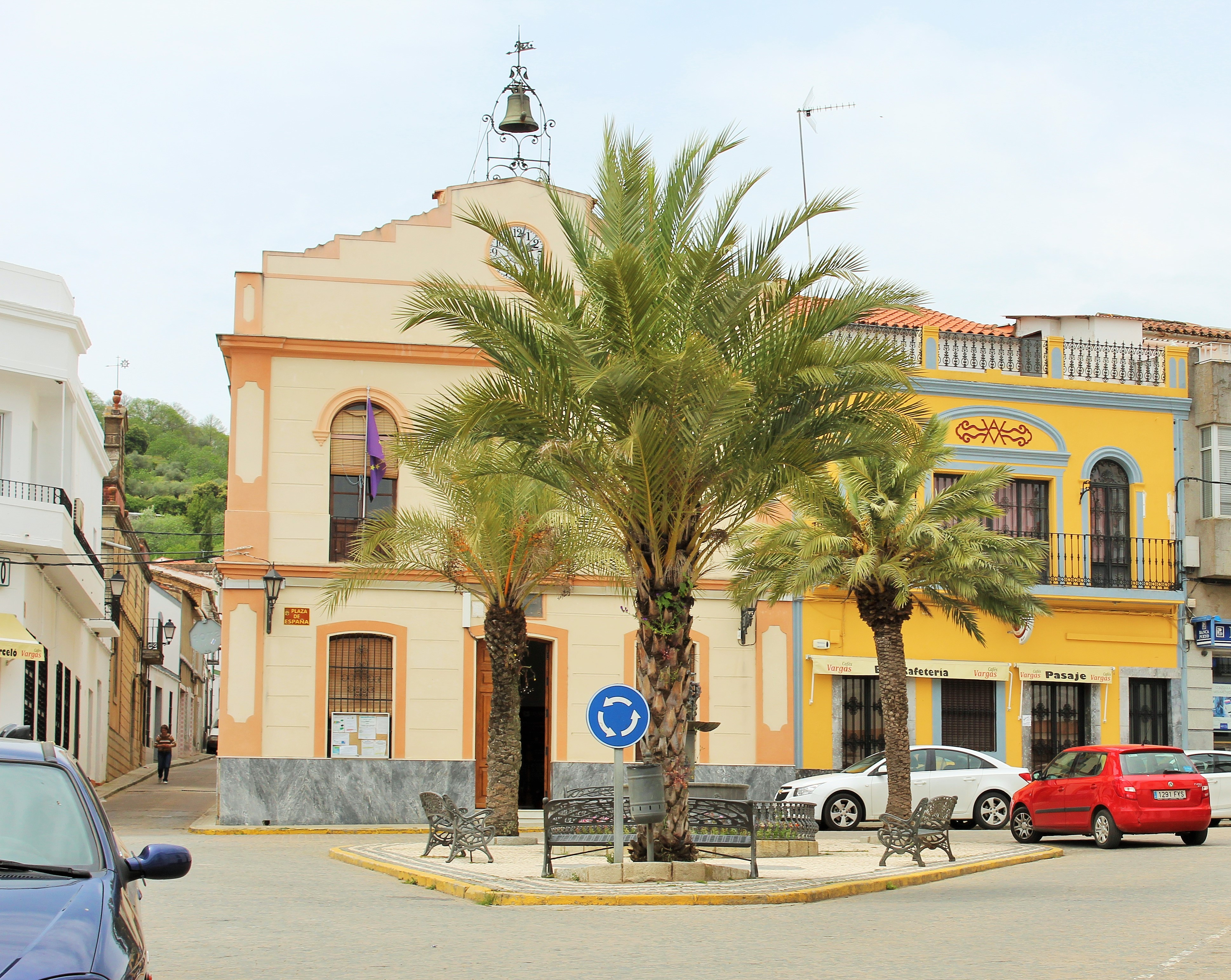
Salvatierra de los Barros Town Hall

Salvatierra de los Barros is a municipality in the province of Badajoz, Extremadura, Spain. It has a population of 1,721 (2014) and an area of 75 km^{2} (29 sq mi).

== See also ==
- List of municipalities in Badajoz
