= Zahínos =

- Municipality
- Coat of arms

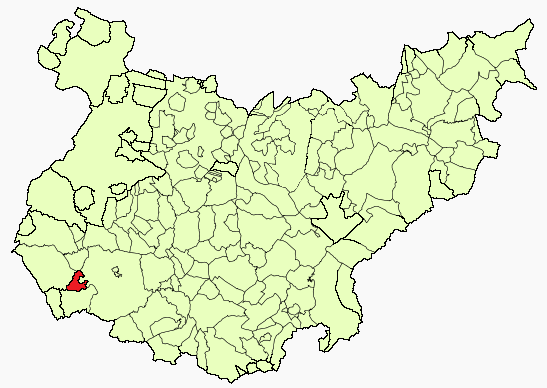

- Location in Spain
- Coordinates: 38°19′50″N 6°57′17″W
- Country: Spain
- Autonomous community: Extremadura
- Province: Badajoz
- Municipality: Zahínos

Area
  - Total: 45 km^{2} (17 sq mi)
- Elevation: 374 m (1,227 ft)

Population (2025-01-01)
  - Total: 2,766
  - Density: 61/km^{2} (160/sq mi)
- Time zone: UTC+1 (CET)
  - Summer (DST): UTC+2 (CEST)

Zahínos (Spanish pronunciation: [θaˈinos]) is a municipality located in the southwestern corner of the province of Badajoz, Extremadura, Spain. It is located close to the border with Portugal.

According to the 2014 census, the municipality has a population of 2864 inhabitants.

== See also ==
- List of municipalities in Badajoz
