= Valle de Santa Ana =

Coordinates: 38°22′N 6°47′W

- municipality
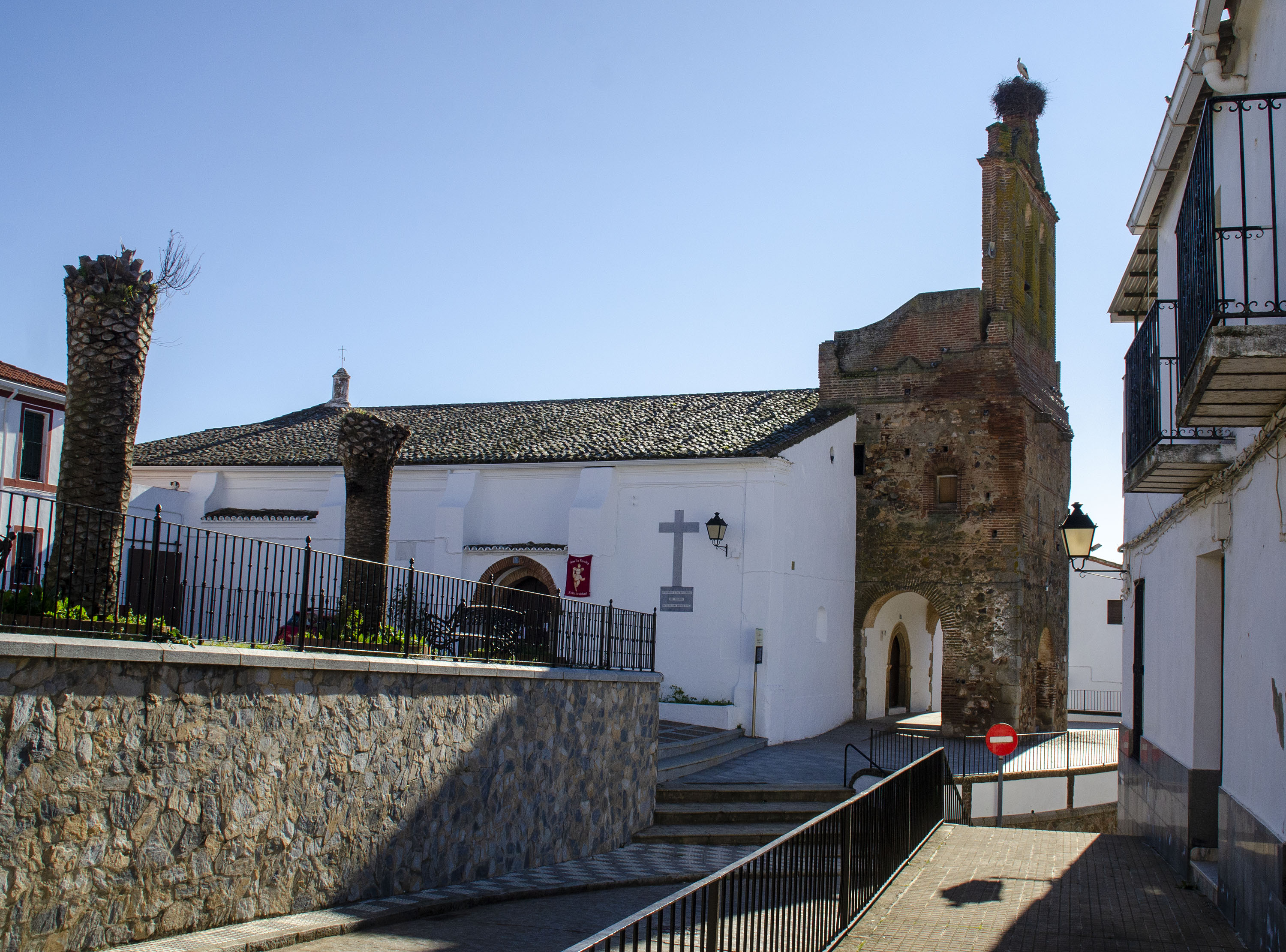

- Flag Coat of arms
- Interactive map of Valle de Santa Ana
- Country: Spain
- Autonomous community: Extremadura
- Province: Badajoz

Area
  - Total: 3 km^{2} (1.2 sq mi)
- Elevation: 505 m (1,657 ft)

Population (2025-01-01)
  - Total: 1,090
  - Density: 360/km^{2} (940/sq mi)
- Time zone: UTC+1 (CET)
  - Summer (DST): UTC+2 (CEST)

Valle de Santa Ana is a municipality located in the province of Badajoz, Extremadura, Spain. According to the 2006 census (INE), the municipality has a population of 1,230 inhabitants.

== See also ==
- List of municipalities in Badajoz
