= Higuera la Real =

Coordinates: 38°08′N 6°41′W

- municipality
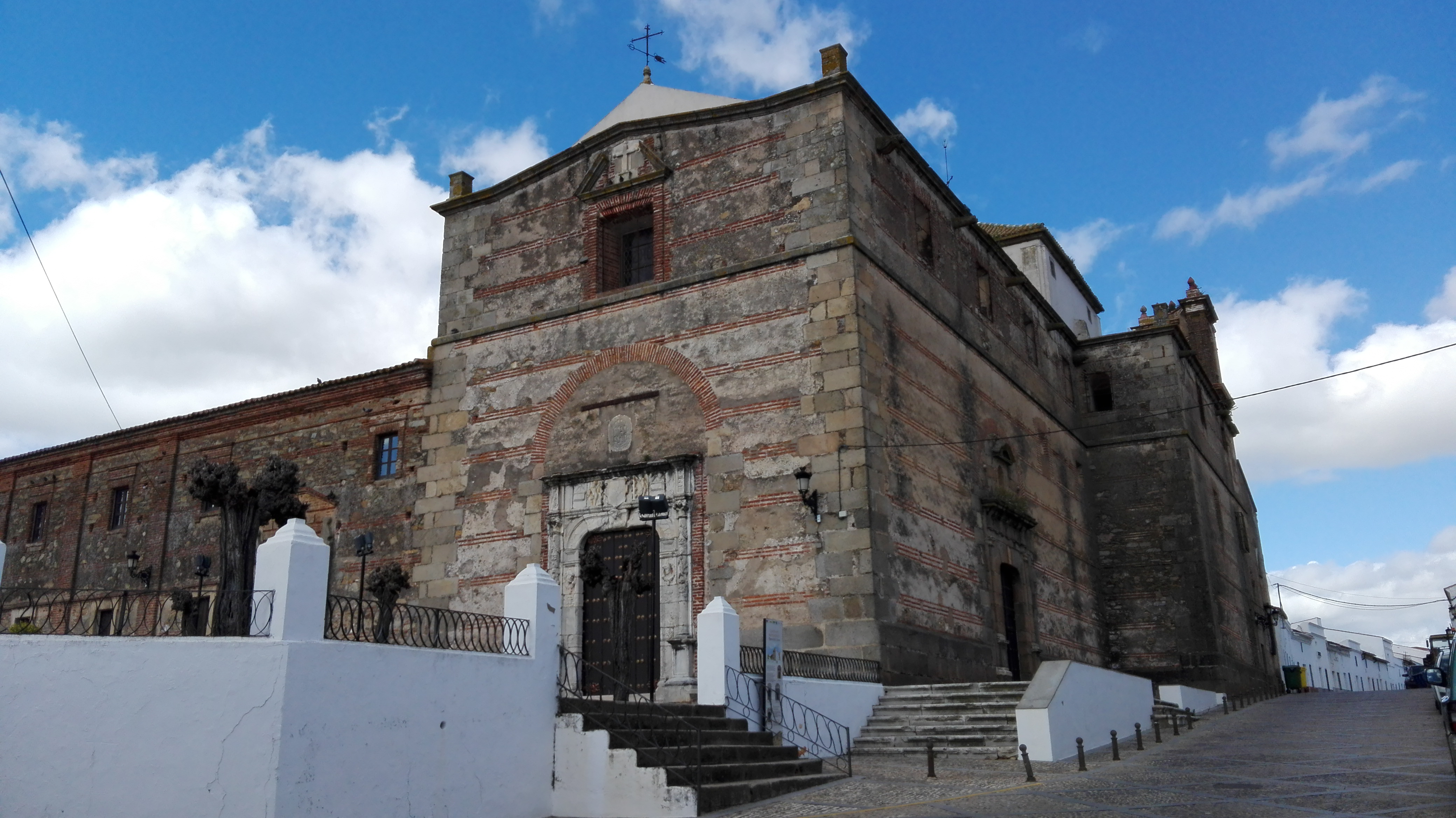
- Church of San Bartolomé en Higuera la Real

- Coat of arms
- Interactive map of Higuera la Real
- Country: Spain
- Autonomous community: Extremadura
- Province: Badajoz

Area
  - Total: 126 km^{2} (49 sq mi)
- Elevation: 610 m (2,000 ft)

Population (2025-01-01)
  - Total: 2,186
  - Density: 17.3/km^{2} (44.9/sq mi)
- Time zone: UTC+1 (CET)
  - Summer (DST): UTC+2 (CEST)

Higuera la Real is a municipality located in the province of Badajoz, Extremadura, Spain. According to the 2005 census (INE), the municipality has a population of 2505 inhabitants.

== See also ==
- List of municipalities in Badajoz
