= Antonio Rodríguez Osuna =

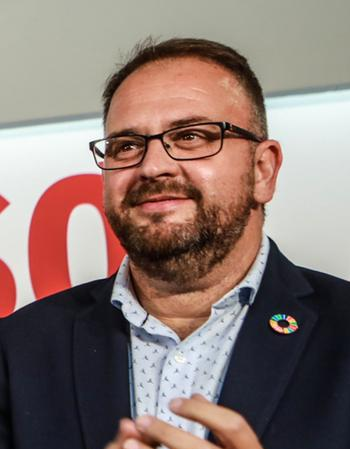

Mayor of Mérida
- Incumbent
- Assumed office 13 June 2015

Member of the Assembly of Extremadura
- In office 2011–2015
- Constituency: Badajoz

Personal details
- Born: 6 March 1975 (age 51) Mérida, Spain
- Party: Spanish Socialist Workers' Party

Antonio Rodríguez Osuna (born 6 March 1975) is a Spanish politician, serving as Mayor of Mérida since 2015. A member of the Spanish Socialist Workers' Party (PSOE), he was member of the Assembly of Extremadura from 2011 to 2015.

== Biography ==
Born on 6 March 1975 in Mérida he earned a title in Physical Education from the University of Extremadura in 1997, later obtaining an MBA in Business Management. He has worked as furniture mover, waiter, gaffer, marquee installer, and as recreational activities coordinator. He is an affiliate of the Unión General de Trabajadores (UGT) trade union. He has also been involved in the catering sector, owning a restaurant in Cáceres and another one in Mérida. Locally nicknamed as "El Rubio" in Mérida, he is a member of the Cofradía de las Tres Caídas and a keen participant in the Carnival, as chirigotero and lyricist.

Following a first spell as municipal councillor in Mérida from 1999 to 2004, he turned to the regional administration of Extremadura, serving as advisor to the regional vice-president Ignacio Sánchez Amor (2004–2007) and as chief of staff of the regional minister of Industry José Luis Navarro (2007–2011).

He ran 11th in the Spanish Socialist Workers' Party–Regionalists list in Badajoz vis-à-vis the 2011 regional election, becoming a member of the 8th term of the Assembly of Extremadura.

Head of the PSOE list for the May 2015 Mérida municipal election, he was elected again as municipal councillor, and, on 13 June 2015, he was invested as Mayor of Mérida, with a simple majority of votes of the plenary. He ran again as leader of the PSOE list for the May 2019 municipal election, renovating his mandate as Mayor on 15 June 2019, thanks to the absolute majority in the Plenary provided by the 13 PSOE municipal councillors.
