= Valencia del Mombuey =

Coordinates: 38°14′30″N 7°7′10″W

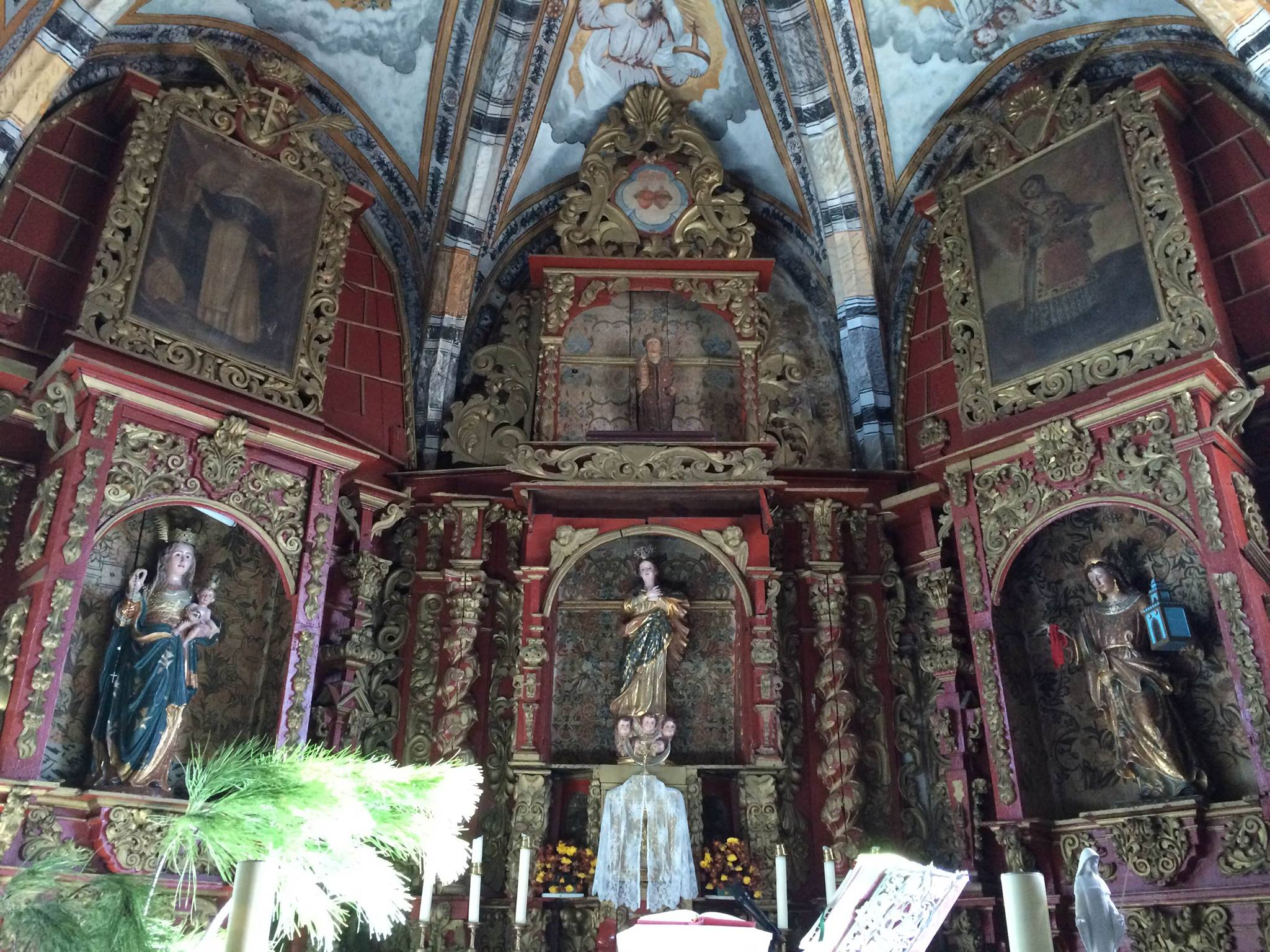

- Coat of arms

- Location in Spain.
- Country: Spain
- Autonomous community: Extremadura
- Province: Badajoz

Area
  - Total: 75 km^{2} (29 sq mi)
- Elevation: 297 m (974 ft)

Population (2025-01-01)
  - Total: 703
  - Density: 9.4/km^{2} (24/sq mi)
- Time zone: UTC+1 (CET)
  - Summer (DST): UTC+2 (CEST)
- Website: www.valenciadelmombuey.es

Valencia del Mombuey is a municipality in the province of Badajoz, Extremadura, Spain. It has a population of 839 and an area of 75 km^{2} (29 sq mi).

== See also ==
- List of municipalities in Badajoz
