= Salvaleón =

Salvaleón, Spain
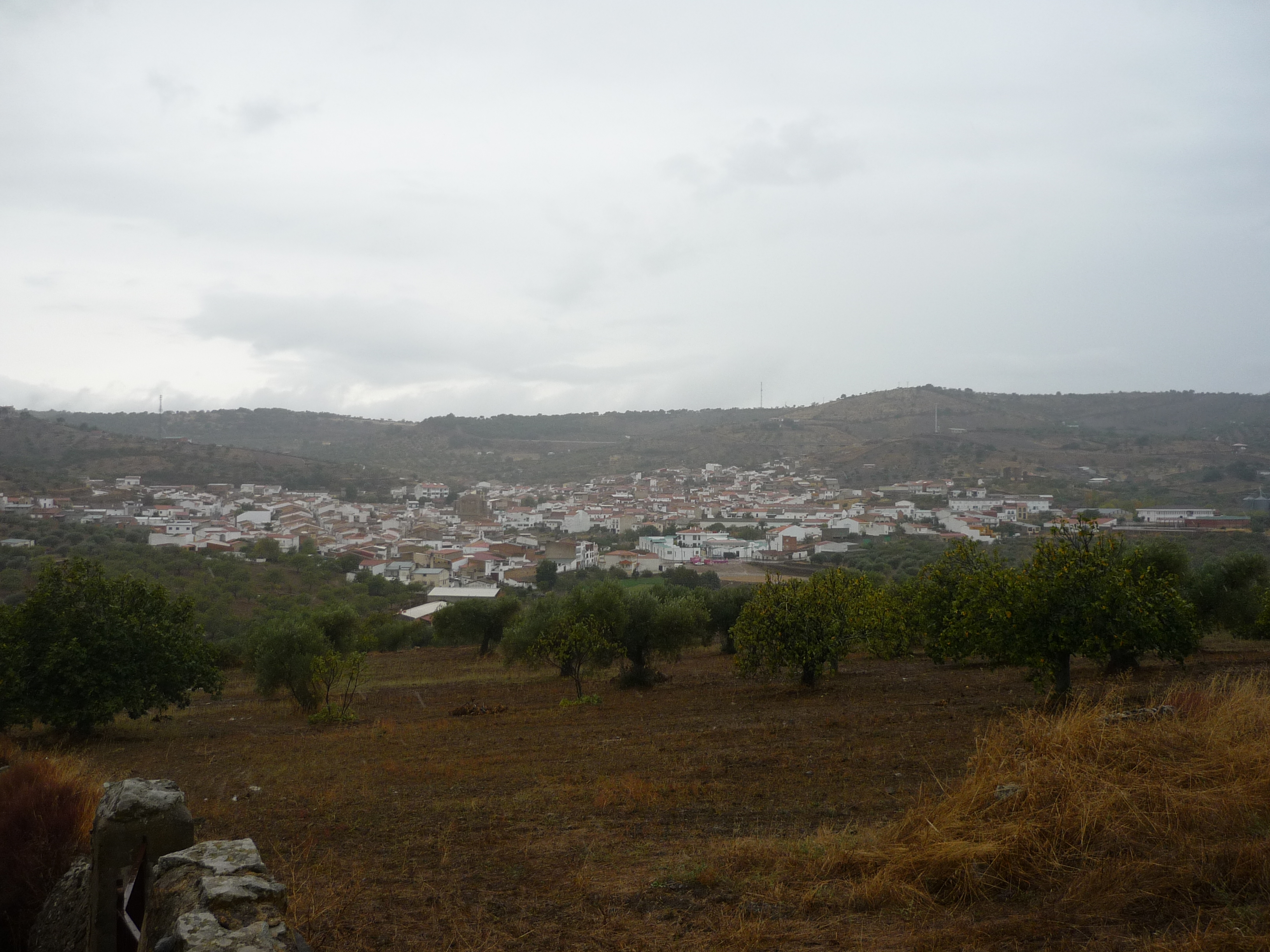

- Coat of arms
- Interactive map of Salvaleón, Spain
- Coordinates: 38°31′N 6°47′W
- Country: Spain
- Autonomous community: Extremadura
- Province: Badajoz
- Municipality: Salvaleón

Area
  - Total: 72 km^{2} (28 sq mi)
- Elevation: 519 m (1,703 ft)

Population (2025-01-01)
  - Total: 1,645
  - Density: 23/km^{2} (59/sq mi)
- Time zone: UTC+1 (CET)
  - Summer (DST): UTC+2 (CEST)

Salvaleón is a municipality located in the province of Badajoz, Extremadura, Spain. According to the 2005 census (INE), the municipality has a population of 2,172 inhabitants.

== See also ==
- List of municipalities in Badajoz
