= University of Extremadura =

Public university in Extremadura, Spain

- Universidad de Extremadura
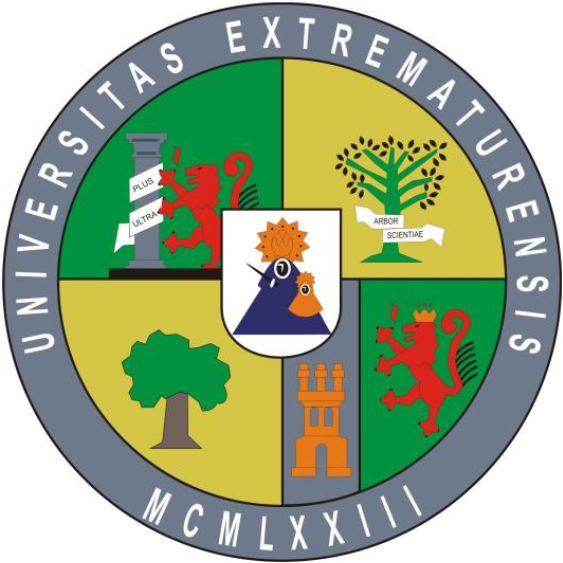
- Other name: UEX
- Type: Public University
- Established: 1973
- Rector: Pedro M. Fernández Salguero
- Administrative staff: 860
- Undergraduates: 22.510
- Postgraduates: 1.941
- Location: Badajoz, Cáceres, Mérida, Plasencia, Spain; 38.88344°N 7.00531°W
- Website: www.unex.es
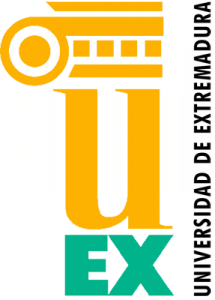

University rankings

Global – Overall
- ARWU World: 701–800 (2023)
- THE World: 1001–1200 (2024)
- USNWR Global: =1049 (2023)

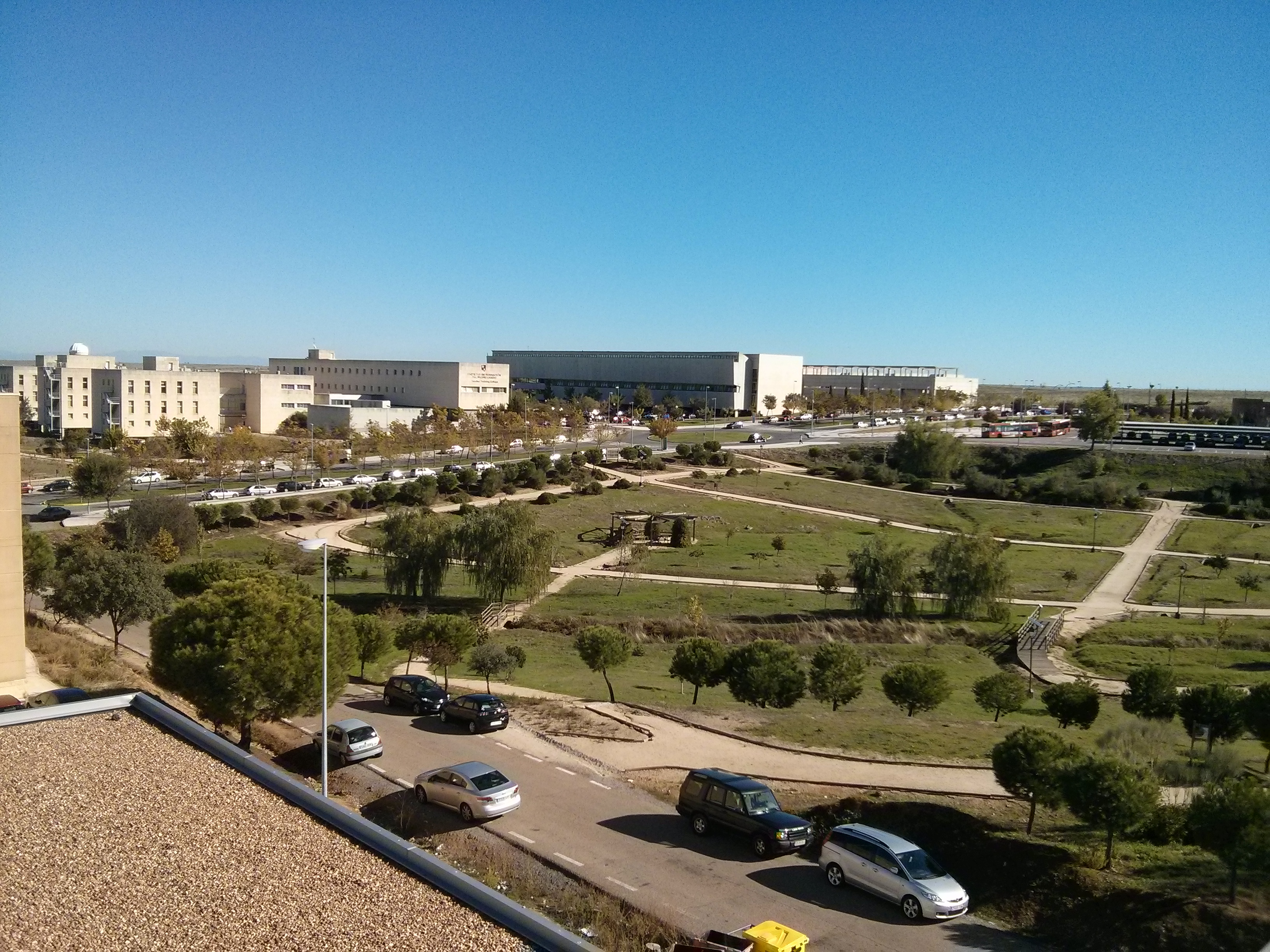
Partial view of Cáceres Campus

University of Extremadura (in Spanish: Universidad de Extremadura) is a Spanish public university in Extremadura (Badajoz and Cáceres).

It was founded in 1973 by Decree 991/1973, May 10 (BOE May 18) of the Ministry of Education and Science of Spain. Currently the University of Extremadura offers 64 Bachelor's Degrees and 32 Master's Degrees in many different fields of knowledge.

Together with the University of Cantabria, Castilla-La Mancha, Balearic Islands, La Rioja, Navarra, Oviedo, Zaragoza and the Basque Country, form the Group G9 of Universities (formed by the universities that are alone in their autonomous community).

== Structure ==
The University of Extremadura is distributed into four different campuses: Badajoz, Cáceres, Mérida and Plasencia. Each campus has different specialities:

=== Badajoz Campus ===
- Faculty of Science (Mathematics, Chemistry, Physics, Chemical Engineering, Biology, Environmental Sciences, Biotechnology, Enology).
- School of Industrial Engineerings (Industrial Engineering, Materials Engineering, Electronic Engineering, Biomedical Engineering, Renewable Energies, Mechanical Engineering, Electrical Engineering).
- Faculty of Economics Sciences.
- Faculty of Education and Psychology.
- Faculty of Medicine.

=== Cáceres Campus ===
- Faculty of Laws
- Faculty of Veterinary
- Faculty of Sport Science
- Faculty of Teacher Training
- Faculty of Nursing and Occupational Therapy
- School of Technology
- Faculty of Philosophy and Letters
- Faculty of Business and Tourism

=== Mérida Campus ===
Mérida Campus offers five different bachelor's degrees: Industrial Design Engineering, Telecommunication Engineering, Information Technologies, Geomatics and Topography, and Nursing (in collaboration with Mérida's Hospital).

=== Plasencia Campus ===
Plasencia Campus offers the Degree in Forestry Engineering, Podiatry and Administration and Business Management.

== UEx Virtual Campus ==
The Virtual Campus of the University of Extremadura (CVUE) complements the education that students receive in the classroom. Based on the New Technologies of Information and Communication aims to provide to teachers, students and administration and services staff, tools that extend and enhance the teaching-learning processes and teamwork. The UEX encourages virtual collaboration to be successfully with these processes, breaking with traditional models.

== Notable alumni ==
- María J. Carro (born 1961), Spanish mathematician
- María Guardiola (born 1978), Spanish politician
- Francisco Manuel de las Heras y Borrero (1951–2013), Spanish historian
- Ana Fernández Militino, Spanish statistician
- Elena Nevado (born 1967), Spanish politician
- Antonio Rodríguez Osuna (born 1975), Spanish politician
- María del Consuelo de Fátima Rodríguez Píriz (1960–2021), Spanish politician
- María Teresa Rejas (born 1946), Spanish educator and politician
