= Opinion polling for the 2027 Spanish local elections =

Local election polling results

In the run up to the 2027 Spanish local elections, various organisations carried out opinion polling to gauge voting intention in local entities in Spain. Results of such polls are displayed in this article. The date range for these opinion polls is from the previous local elections, held on 28 May 2023, to the date on which the next elections are expected to be held under the current electoral law, on 23 May 2027.

Polls are listed in reverse chronological order, showing the most recent first and using the dates when the survey fieldwork was done, as opposed to the date of publication. Where the fieldwork dates are unknown, the date of publication is given instead. The highest percentage figure in each polling survey is displayed with its background shaded in the leading party's colour. If a tie ensues, this is applied to the figures with the highest percentages. The "Lead" columns on the right shows the percentage-point difference between the parties with the highest percentages in a given poll.

== Sub-national polling ==
Opinion poll results for municipalities in each of Spain's autonomous communities, as well as for the Canarian cabildos insulares and the Balearic island councils, may be found through the following links:

- Opinion polling for the 2027 Spanish local elections (Andalusia)
- Opinion polling for the 2027 Spanish local elections (Aragon)
- Opinion polling for the 2027 Spanish local elections (Asturias)
- Opinion polling for the 2027 Spanish local elections (Balearic Islands)
- Opinion polling for the 2027 Spanish local elections (Basque Country)
- Opinion polling for the 2027 Spanish local elections (Canary Islands)
- Opinion polling for the 2027 Spanish local elections (Cantabria)
- Opinion polling for the 2027 Spanish local elections (Castile and León)
- Opinion polling for the 2027 Spanish local elections (Castilla–La Mancha)
- Opinion polling for the 2027 Spanish local elections (Catalonia)
- Opinion polling for the 2027 Spanish local elections (Extremadura)
- Opinion polling for the 2027 Spanish local elections (Galicia)
- Opinion polling for the 2027 Spanish local elections (La Rioja)
- Opinion polling for the 2027 Spanish local elections (Community of Madrid)
- Opinion polling for the 2027 Spanish local elections (Region of Murcia)
- Opinion polling for the 2027 Spanish local elections (Navarre)
- Opinion polling for the 2027 Spanish local elections (Valencian Community)
