= Opinion polling for the 2015 Spanish local elections (Extremadura) =

In the run up to the 2015 Spanish local elections, various organisations carried out opinion polling to gauge voting intention in local entities in Spain. Results of such polls for municipalities in Extremadura are displayed in this article. The date range for these opinion polls is from the previous local elections, held on 22 May 2011, to the day the next elections were held, on 24 May 2015.

Polls are listed in reverse chronological order, showing the most recent first and using the dates when the survey fieldwork was done, as opposed to the date of publication. Where the fieldwork dates are unknown, the date of publication is given instead. The highest percentage figure in each polling survey is displayed with its background shaded in the leading party's colour. If a tie ensues, this is applied to the figures with the highest percentages. The "Lead" columns on the right shows the percentage-point difference between the parties with the highest percentages in a given poll.

== Municipalities ==
=== Badajoz ===
Polling firm/Commissioner	Fieldwork date	Sample size	Turnout	PP	PSOE	IU	UPyD	C's	Vox	RB	Lead
2015 municipal election	24 May 2015	—N/a	61.3	39.5; 13	30.3; 9	2.9; 0	1.5; 0	7.1; 2	0.5; 0	10.4; 3	9.2
Sigma Dos/Hoy	8–10 Feb 2015	400	?	48.3; 15/16	22.7; 6/7	2.5; 0	3.2; 0	8.3; 2	–	11.1; 3	25.6
Vaubán/Extremadura 7 Días	24–27 Nov 2014	437	?	38.3; 12	26.7; 8	9.2; 3	11.9; 4	2.7; 0	1.4; 0	–	11.6
Vaubán/Extremadura 7 Días	29–31 Mar 2014	?	?	48.4	25.1	12.9	9.7	–	–	–	23.3
Sigma Dos/Hoy	24–28 Jan 2014	400	?	53.6; 15/16	29.2; 8/9	10.2; 3	–	–	–	–	24.4
2011 municipal election	22 May 2011	—N/a	63.6	56.8; 17	28.0; 8	7.2; 2	3.6; 0	–	–	–	28.8

=== Cáceres ===
Polling firm/Commissioner	Fieldwork date	Sample size	Turnout	PP	PSOE	IU	UPyD	CAC	C's	Lead
2015 municipal election	24 May 2015	—N/a	67.8	34.5; 11	27.6; 8	3.8; 0	1.8; 0	8.8; 2	13.9; 4	6.9
Sigma Dos/Hoy	27 Feb–2 Mar 2015	400	?	51.5; 15/16	19.6; 6/7	4.7; 0	–	12.2; 2	4.1; 3	31.9
Vaubán/Extremadura 7 Días	29–31 Mar 2014	?	?	46.7	25.9	13.6	11.1	–	–	20.8
2011 municipal election	22 May 2011	—N/a	70.2	56.6; 16	24.3; 7	7.8; 2	4.5; 0	–	–	32.3

=== Don Benito ===
Polling firm/Commissioner	Fieldwork date	Sample size	Turnout	PP	PSOE	IU	UPyD	C's	DBeC	Lead
2015 municipal election	24 May 2015	—N/a	68.5	33.8; 8	49.7; 13	4.3; 0	1.5; 0	4.3; 0	4.3; 0	15.9
Plaza Digital	14 Jan 2015	?	?	21.0; 6	29.0; 8	9.0; 2	1.0; 0	4.3; 0	18.0; 5	8.0
2011 municipal election	22 May 2011	—N/a	72.4	50.1; 11	44.6; 10	3.5; 0	–	–	–	5.5

=== Mérida ===
Polling firm/Commissioner	Fieldwork date	Sample size	Turnout	PP	PSOE	IU	SIEx	UPyD	MP	C's	Lead
2015 municipal election	24 May 2015	—N/a	66.1	28.3; 8	42.1; 11	7.1; 0	(Note: Within PSOE.)	1.8; 2	7.3; 2	7.7; 2	13.8
Sigma Dos/Hoy	6–9 Mar 2015	400	?	36.1; 10/11	32.5; 9/10	5.2; 0/1	–	–	14.7; 4	5.3; 0/1	3.6
Vaubán/Extremadura 7 Días	29–31 Mar 2014	?	?	39.5	33.8	14.1	–	10.2	–	–	5.7
2011 municipal election	22 May 2011	—N/a	69.6	45.0; 13	36.9; 10	6.0; 1	5.1; 1	1.8; 0	–	–	8.1

=== Plasencia ===
Polling firm/Commissioner	Fieldwork date	Sample size	Turnout	PP	PSOE	IU	UPEx	UPyD	eX	PeC	C's	Lead
2015 municipal election	24 May 2015	—N/a	64.3	42.1; 11	25.9; 7	4.7; 0	(Note: Within C's.)	1.9; 0	6.6; 1	6.5; 1	6.9; 1	16.2
Sigma Dos/Hoy	13–16 Mar 2015	400	?	55.6; 13	20.1; 4/5	5.0; 0/1		–	–	8.2; 2	5.9; 1	35.5
Vaubán/Extremadura 7 Días	29–31 Mar 2014	?	?	45.7	28.3	14.5	–	9.6	–	–	–	17.4
2011 municipal election	22 May 2011	—N/a	68.1	55.2; 13	24.4; 6	7.8; 1	5.8; 1	2.9; 0	1.3; 0	–	–	30.8
