= Opinion polling for the 2019 Spanish local elections (Extremadura) =

In the run up to the 2019 Spanish local elections, various organisations carried out opinion polling to gauge voting intention in local entities in Spain. Results of such polls for municipalities in Extremadura are displayed in this article. The date range for these opinion polls is from the previous local elections, held on 24 May 2015, to the day the next elections were held, on 26 May 2019.

Polls are listed in reverse chronological order, showing the most recent first and using the dates when the survey fieldwork was done, as opposed to the date of publication. Where the fieldwork dates are unknown, the date of publication is given instead. The highest percentage figure in each polling survey is displayed with its background shaded in the leading party's colour. If a tie ensues, this is applied to the figures with the highest percentages. The "Lead" columns on the right shows the percentage-point difference between the parties with the highest percentages in a given poll.

== Municipalities ==
=== Badajoz ===
Polling firm/Commissioner	Fieldwork date	Sample size	Turnout	PP	PSOE	Podemos	Cs	BA	IU	Vox	Unidas Podemos	JxB	Lead
2019 municipal election	26 May 2019	—N/a	58.5	30.9; 9	37.5; 12	(Note: Within Unidas Podemos.)	13.2; 4	4.8; 0		5.5; 1	5.7; 1	1.0; 0	6.6
Sigma Dos/Hoy	6–8 May 2019	400	?	34.4; 9/10	31.8; 9/10		14.1; 4	–		6.1; 1	10.6; 3	–	2.6
Ágora Integral/El Periódico	30 Apr–8 May 2019	500	?	29.5; 8/10	32.4; 9/11		? 4/5	? 0/1		? 0/1	? 3/4	–	2.9
Vaubán/Extremadura 7 Días	8–12 Nov 2018	656	?	30.6; 9/10	28.6; 8/9		11.9; 4	6.2; 1/2		4.1; 0/1	8.9; 2	4.4; 0/1	2.0
Sigma Dos/Hoy	22–28 May 2018	400	?	30.8; 9/10	29.7; 8/9	10.8; 3	21.5; 6	–	–	–	–	–	1.1
2015 municipal election	24 May 2015	—N/a	61.3	39.5; 13	30.3; 9	10.4 (Note: Results for RecuperarBadajoz.); 3	7.1; 2	2.9; 0	2.9; 0	0.5; 0	–	–	9.2

=== Cáceres ===
Polling firm/Commissioner	Fieldwork date	Sample size	Turnout	PP	PSOE	Cs	Podemos	IU	Unidas Podemos	Vox	Lead
2019 municipal election	26 May 2019	—N/a	64.8	27.1; 7	34.5; 9	19.2; 5			10.6; 3	6.5; 1	7.4
Sigma Dos/Hoy	6–8 May 2019	400	?	21.0; 5/6	35.5; 9/10	22.7; 6			11.8; 3	5.5; 1	12.8
Ágora Integral/El Periódico	30 Apr–8 May 2019	400	?	27.1; 7/8	30.6; 8/9	? 4/5			? 4/5	? 0/1	3.5
Sigma Dos/Hoy	22–28 May 2018	400	?	32.6; 8/9	20.8; 5/6	29.8; 8			12.3; 3	–	2.8
2015 municipal election	24 May 2015	—N/a	67.8	34.5; 11	27.6; 8	13.9; 4	8.8 (Note: Results for CAC.); 2	3.8; 0	–	–	6.9

=== Mérida ===
Polling firm/Commissioner	Fieldwork date	Sample size	Turnout	PSOE	PP	Cs	Podemos	IU	Unidas Podemos	Vox	Lead
2019 municipal election	26 May 2019	—N/a	60.6	48.9; 13	19.1; 5	13.7; 3			9.4; 2	7.0; 2	29.8
Sigma Dos/Hoy	6–8 May 2019	400	?	49.4; 13/14	15.2; 4	11.6; 3			13.0; 3	7.5; 1/2	34.2
Ágora Integral/El Periódico	30 Apr–8 May 2019	400	?	42.2; 11/12	20.9; 5/6	? 3/4			12.4; 2/3	? 0/1	11.3
Sigma Dos/Hoy	22–28 May 2018	400	?	39.6; 11/12	22.6; 6	21.3; 5/6	3.1; 0	7.6; 2	–	–	17.0
2015 municipal election	24 May 2015	—N/a	66.1	42.1; 11	28.3; 8	7.7; 2	7.3 (Note: Results for Participa.); 2	7.1; 2	–	–	13.8

=== Plasencia ===
Polling firm/Commissioner	Fieldwork date	Sample size	Turnout	PP	PSOE	Cs	eX	PeC	IU	Vox	Podemos	Unidas Podemos	Lead
2019 municipal election	26 May 2019	—N/a	62.3	50.5; 12	25.7; 6	5.5; 1	–	3.2; 0		2.2; 0		8.5; 2	24.8
Sigma Dos/Hoy	6–8 May 2019	400	?	44.9; 10/11	28.0; 6	8.3; 2	–	–		4.7; 0/1		8.2; 2	16.9
Ágora Integral/El Periódico	30 Apr–8 May 2019	350	?	39.7; 9/10	29.9; 7/8	? 1/2	–	? 0/1		2.8; 0		? 1/2	9.8
Sigma Dos/Hoy	22–28 May 2018	400	?	45.3; 11/12	26.4; 6/7	11.2; 2	–	6.8; 1	–	–	3.7; 0	–	18.9
2015 municipal election	24 May 2015	—N/a	64.3	42.1; 11	25.9; 7	6.9; 1	6.6; 1	6.5; 1	4.7; 0	0.5; 0	–	–	16.2
