= Opinion polling for the 2023 Spanish local elections (Extremadura) =

In the run up to the 2023 Spanish local elections, various organisations carried out opinion polling to gauge voting intention in local entities in Spain. Results of such polls for municipalities in Extremadura are displayed in this article. The date range for these opinion polls is from the previous local elections, held on 26 May 2019, to the day the next elections were held, on 28 May 2023.

Polls are listed in reverse chronological order, showing the most recent first and using the dates when the survey fieldwork was done, as opposed to the date of publication. Where the fieldwork dates are unknown, the date of publication is given instead. The highest percentage figure in each polling survey is displayed with its background shaded in the leading party's colour. If a tie ensues, this is applied to the figures with the highest percentages. The "Lead" columns on the right shows the percentage-point difference between the parties with the highest percentages in a given poll.

== Municipalities ==
=== Badajoz ===
Polling firm/Commissioner	Fieldwork date	Sample size	Turnout	PSOE	PP	CS	Unidas Podemos	Vox	BA	JUEx	Lead
2023 municipal election	28 May 2023	—N/a	63.2	31.6; 10	44.4; 14	1.4; 0	4.1; 0	10.2; 3	2.0; 0	3.1; 0	12.8
Ágora Integral/El Periódico	8–12 May 2023	500	?	35.6; 11	39.0; 12/13	1.2; 0	5.1; 1	6.8; 2	–	4.9; 0/1	3.4
GAD3/ABC	28 Apr–3 May 2023	403	?	31.8; 10	39.7; 12/13	2.7; 0	6.9; 1/2	12.0; 3	3.4; 0	–	7.9
Sigma Dos/El Mundo	30 Nov–5 Dec 2022	900	?	33.3; 10	37.4; 11/12	8.5; 2	6.2; 1/2	6.3; 1/2	–	–	4.1
Demoscopia y Servicios/PP	21 Sep 2022	?	?	? 10	? 12	? 1	? 1	? 3	–	–	?
Demoscopia y Servicios/PP	20–22 Jun 2022	1,000	?	34.7; 10	36.3; 11	8.3; 2	5.9; 1	10.5; 3	–	–	1.6
Celeste-Tel/PSOE	22 Oct–2 Nov 2021	500	58.5	38.3; 12	34.6; 10	9.9; 3	? 1	5.7; 1	–	–	3.7
ElectoPanel/Electomanía	1 Apr–15 Jun 2020	?	?	40.4; 13	30.9; 10	6.6; 2	4.0; 0	9.2; 2	4.2; 0	–	9.5
Celeste-Tel/PSOE	5–15 Jul 2019	400	?	43.0; 14	30.6; 9	11.4; 3	5.1; 1	4.9; 0	3.3; 0	–	12.4
2019 municipal election	26 May 2019	—N/a	58.5	37.5; 12	30.9; 9	13.2; 4	5.7; 1	5.5; 1	4.8; 0	–	6.6

=== Cáceres ===
Polling firm/Commissioner	Fieldwork date	Sample size	Turnout	PSOE	PP	CS	Unidas Podemos	Vox	CV	Lead
2023 municipal election	28 May 2023	—N/a	66.9	33.4; 10	40.1; 11	1.8; 0	6.7; 2	9.1; 2	3.5; 0	6.7
Ágora Integral/El Periódico	8–12 May 2023	450	?	33.9; 10/11	37.9; 11	1.7; 0	7.1; 2	7.8; 2	5.2; 0/1	4.0
GAD3/ABC	28 Apr–3 May 2023	401	?	34.9; 9	46.1; 12/13	0.7; 0	8.5; 2	7.0; 1/2	–	11.2
EM-Analytics/Electomanía	13 May–10 Oct 2021	360	?	36.2; 10	30.1; 8	5.3; 1	10.3; 2	14.7; 4	–	6.1
2019 municipal election	26 May 2019	—N/a	64.8	34.5; 9	27.1; 7	19.2; 5	10.6; 3	6.5; 1	–	7.4

=== Mérida ===
Polling firm/Commissioner	Fieldwork date	Sample size	Turnout	PSOE	PP	CS	Unidas Podemos	Vox	XM	Lead
2023 municipal election	28 May 2023	—N/a	63.4	48.5; 14	24.1; 6	1.5; 0	6.5; 1	8.8; 2	7.2; 2	24.4
Ágora Integral/El Periódico	8–12 May 2023	350	?	45.8; 12/13	28.8; 8	1.7; 0	7.5; 2	7.2; 2	5.5; 0/1	17.0
2019 municipal election	26 May 2019	—N/a	60.6	48.9; 13	19.1; 5	13.7; 3	9.4; 2	7.0; 2	–	29.8

=== Plasencia ===
Polling firm/Commissioner	Fieldwork date	Sample size	Turnout	PP	PSOE	Unidas Podemos	CS	Vox	JUEx	Lead
2023 municipal election	28 May 2023	—N/a	61.6	51.6; 12	24.2; 6	9.2; 2	0.6; 0	6.2; 1	1.9; 0	27.4
Ágora Integral/El Periódico	8–12 May 2023	300	?	55.3; 13/14	20.1; 4/5	6.9; 1/2	1.1; 0	5.7; 1	5.3; 0/1	35.2
2019 municipal election	26 May 2019	—N/a	62.3	50.5; 12	25.7; 6	8.5; 2	5.5; 1	2.2; 0	–	24.8
