= Opinion polling for the 2027 Spanish local elections (Canary Islands) =

In the run up to the 2027 Spanish local elections, various organisations carry out opinion polling to gauge voting intention in local entities in Spain. Results of such polls for municipalities and island cabildos in the Canary Islands are displayed in this article. The date range for these opinion polls is from the previous local elections, held on 28 May 2023, to the day the next elections will be held, on 23 May 2027.

Polls are listed in reverse chronological order, showing the most recent first and using the dates when the survey fieldwork was done, as opposed to the date of publication. Where the fieldwork dates are unknown, the date of publication is given instead. The highest percentage figure in each polling survey is displayed with its background shaded in the leading party's colour. If a tie ensues, this is applied to the figures with the highest percentages. The "Lead" columns on the right shows the percentage-point difference between the parties with the highest percentages in a given poll.

== Municipalities ==
=== Arrecife ===
Polling firm/Commissioner	Fieldwork date	Sample size	Turnout	PSOE	PP	CCa	Vox	NCa	USP	Lead
Sigma Dos	15 Jan 2026	400	49.0	29.5; 8	32.5; 9	18.7; 5	12.3; 3	2.0; 0	2.1; 0	3.0
Perfiles/CCa	17–24 Mar 2025	?	?	19.0– 20.0; 6	30.0– 31.0; 9	25.0– 26.0; 8	7.0– 8.0; 2	–	–	5.0
2023 municipal election	28 May 2023	—N/a	42.0	28.1; 9	24.2; 7	23.0; 7	7.6; 2	4.7; 0	4.2; 0	3.9

=== Las Palmas de Gran Canaria ===
Polling firm/Commissioner	Fieldwork date	Sample size	Turnout	PSOE	PP	Vox	NCa	USP	CCa	1º CAN	Lead
GCEMOP/Atlántico Hoy	19–25 May 2026	279	?	26.0– 27.0; 9/10	26.0– 27.0; 9/10	15.0– 16.0; 5/6	5.0– 6.0; 1/2	? 0	6.0– 7.0; 2	6.0– 7.0; 2	Tie
2023 municipal election	28 May 2023	—N/a	50.8	33.1; 12	27.2; 9	11.3; 4	6.1; 2	5.4; 1	5.2; 1	–	5.9

=== Santa Cruz de Tenerife ===
Polling firm/Commissioner	Fieldwork date	Sample size	Turnout	PSOE	CCa	PP	Vox	USP	DVC	Lead
GCEMOP/Atlántico Hoy	19–25 May 2026	274	?	29.0– 30.0; 9	28.0– 29.0; 8/9	15.0– 16.0; 4/5	11.0– 12.0; 3/4	–	4.0– 5.0; 0/1	1.0
Celeste-Tel	21 Jul 2025	800	53.6	27.7; 9	29.7; 9	23.6; 7	8.3; 2	4.5; 0	3.2; 0	2.0
Celeste-Tel	2 Dec 2024	800	52.0	28.8; 9	28.5; 9	24.7; 7	8.1; 2	4.2; 0	–	0.3
SyM Consulting	14–18 Sep 2024	1,000	45.3	23.7; 6/7	30.6; 9	29.3; 8/9	12.3; 3	–	–	1.3
2023 municipal election	28 May 2023	—N/a	54.3	30.1; 10	28.9; 9	16.1; 5	8.7; 3	4.5; 0	3.6; 0	1.2

== Island Cabildos ==
=== Gran Canaria ===
Polling firm/Commissioner	Fieldwork date	Sample size	Turnout	NCa	PSOE	PP	CCa	Vox	UxGC	USP	DVC	1º CAN	Lead
GCEMOP/Atlántico Hoy	19–25 May 2026	557	?	18.0– 19.0; 6/7	17.0– 18.0; 6	15.0– 16.0; 5/6	11.0– 12.0; 3/4	11.0– 12.0; 3/4	–	–	–	8.0– 9.0; 2/3	1.0
Ágora Integral/Canarias Ahora	15–26 May 2025	500	?	17.9; 6	22.8; 8	21.5; 7	? 3	? 3	–	? 0	? 0	7.1; 2	1.3
2023 island council election	28 May 2023	—N/a	55.8	24.4; 8	21.8; 8	20.4; 7	9.0; 3	8.9; 3	4.8; 0	3.4; 0	1.8; 0	–	2.6

=== Lanzarote ===
Polling firm/Commissioner	Fieldwork date	Sample size	Turnout	CCa	PSOE	PP	NCa	Vox	USP	JxL	Lead
Celeste-Tel	17–31 Jul 2026	400	48.8	28.4; 7	27.1; 7	18.8; 5	6.9; 1	7.0; 1	–	7.2; 2	1.3
Sigma Dos	15 Jan 2026	?	50.4	29.7; 7/8	28.7; 7/8	17.9; 4/5	4.9; 0/1	10.7; 3	3.3; 0	–	1.0
Perfiles/CCa	17–24 Mar 2025	508	?	31.0– 32.0; 10	21.0– 22.0; 6	18.0– 19.0; 5	5.0– 6.0; 1	5.0– 6.0; 1	–	–	10.0
2023 island council election	28 May 2023	—N/a	50.2	28.9; 8	28.8; 8	17.2; 4	8.8; 2	6.1; 1	4.2; 0	–	0.1

=== Tenerife ===
Polling firm/Commissioner	Fieldwork date	Sample size	Turnout	PSOE	CCa	PP	Vox	USP	DVC	NCa	Lead
GCEMOP/Atlántico Hoy	19–25 May 2026	574	?	24.0– 25.0; 9	23.0– 24.0; 8/9	18.0– 19.0; 7	9.0– 10.0; 3/4	–	8.0– 9.0; 2/3	–	1.0
Ágora Integral/Canarias Ahora	15–26 May 2025	500	?	27.2; 10	31.1; 11	21.3; 8	? 2	? 0	? 0	–	3.9
2023 island council election	28 May 2023	—N/a	58.2	28.7; 11	27.4; 10	20.1; 8	7.1; 2	4.5; 0	4.3; 0	2.6; 0	1.3
