= Opinion polling for the 2027 Spanish local elections (Navarre) =

In the run up to the 2027 Spanish local elections, various organisations carry out opinion polling to gauge voting intention in local entities in Spain. Results of such polls for municipalities in Navarre are displayed in this article. The date range for these opinion polls is from the previous local elections, held on 28 May 2023, to the day the next elections will be held, on 23 May 2027.

Polls are listed in reverse chronological order, showing the most recent first and using the dates when the survey fieldwork was done, as opposed to the date of publication. Where the fieldwork dates are unknown, the date of publication is given instead. The highest percentage figure in each polling survey is displayed with its background shaded in the leading party's colour. If a tie ensues, this is applied to the figures with the highest percentages. The "Lead" columns on the right shows the percentage-point difference between the parties with the highest percentages in a given poll.

== Municipalities ==
=== Pamplona ===
| Polling firm/Commissioner | Fieldwork date | Sample size | Turnout | UPN | EH Bildu | PSN–PSOE | PP | GBai | C/Z | Vox | Lead |
|---|---|---|---|---|---|---|---|---|---|---|---|
| CIES/UPN | 9–17 Apr 2024 | ? | ? | 35.6; 11 | 35.2; 10 | 11.5; 3 | 5.3; 1 | 6.5; 2 | 3.2; 0 | 2.1; 0 | 0.4 |
| 2023 municipal election | 28 May 2023 | —N/a | 66.6 | 30.3; 9 | 27.4; 8 | 15.7; 5 | 8.4; 2 | 7.6; 2 | 5.2; 1 | 2.9; 0 | 2.9 |
