= Opinion polling for the 2027 Spanish local elections (Galicia) =

In the run up to the 2027 Spanish local elections, various organisations carry out opinion polling to gauge voting intention in local entities in Spain. Results of such polls for municipalities in Galicia are displayed in this article. The date range for these opinion polls is from the previous local elections, held on 28 May 2023, to the day the next elections will be held, on 23 May 2027.

Polls are listed in reverse chronological order, showing the most recent first and using the dates when the survey fieldwork was done, as opposed to the date of publication. Where the fieldwork dates are unknown, the date of publication is given instead. The highest percentage figure in each polling survey is displayed with its background shaded in the leading party's colour. If a tie ensues, this is applied to the figures with the highest percentages. The "Lead" columns on the right shows the percentage-point difference between the parties with the highest percentages in a given poll.

== Municipalities ==
=== A Coruña ===
Polling firm/Commissioner	Fieldwork date	Sample size	Turnout	PP	PSdeG–PSOE	BNG	Marea Atlántica	Podemos	Vox	Lead
DemosGal/El Ideal Gallego	24 May 2026	400	?	42.4; 13	28.6; 9	13.9; 4	–	6.4; 1	–	13.8
Sondaxe/La Voz de Galicia	14–21 May 2026	400	?	38.5; 12	30.1; 9	18.8; 6	0.7; 0	3.8; 0	4.5; 0	8.4
DemosGal/El Ideal Gallego	27 Jun–4 Jul 2025	400	?	41.8; 13	30.3; 9/10	14.6; 4	1.0; 0	4.8; 0/1	4.1; 0	11.5
Sondaxe/La Voz de Galicia	12–22 May 2025	400	?	39.7; 12	31.5; 10	17.0; 5	2.3; 0	2.6; 0	4.6; 0	8.2
DemosGal/El Ideal Gallego	20–29 May 2024	403	?	42.4; 13	28.6; 9	18.5; 5	–	–	–	13.8
Sondaxe/La Voz de Galicia	13–22 May 2024	400	?	37.9; 12	30.1; 10	16.8; 5	–	–	–	7.8
2023 municipal election	28 May 2023	—N/a	59.0	36.5; 12	31.4; 11	13.7; 4	4.9; 0	4.2; 0	3.9; 0	5.1

=== Cambre ===
Polling firm/Commissioner	Fieldwork date	Sample size	Turnout	UxC	PP	PSdeG–PSOE	BNG	AV	Vox	UL	Lead
DemosGal/Noticias Coruña	12–18 Mar 2026	340	?	28.8; 6/7	19.2; 4/5	12.8; 3	12.3; 2/3	9.1; 2	8.7; 2	2.3; 0	9.6
2023 municipal election	28 May 2023	—N/a	58.4	29.1; 7	20.9; 5	14.8; 4	12.8; 3	10.2; 2	3.7; 0	3.6; 0	8.2

=== Culleredo ===
Polling firm/Commissioner	Fieldwork date	Sample size	Turnout	PSdeG–PSOE	PP	BNG	AV	UL	Vox	Lead
DemosGal/Noticias Coruña	21–25 Feb 2026	340	?	27.4; 6/7	30.9; 7/8	21.5; 5	10.8; 2	0.9; 0	3.6; 0	3.5
2023 municipal election	28 May 2023	—N/a	58.4	34.8; 8	30.0; 7	20.6; 4	10.7; 2	2.1; 0	–	4.8

=== Ferrol ===
Polling firm/Commissioner	Fieldwork date	Sample size	Turnout	PP	PSdeG–PSOE	BNG	FeC	Lead
Sondaxe/La Voz de Galicia	14–21 May 2026	400	?	45.8; 13	26.1; 7	10.1; 3	7.5; 2	19.7
Sondaxe/La Voz de Galicia	12–22 May 2025	400	?	47.6; 13	27.3; 8	11.2; 3	6.7; 1	20.3
Sondaxe/La Voz de Galicia	13–22 May 2024	400	?	45.8; 13	27.1; 7	12.3; 3	8.1; 2	18.7
2023 municipal election	28 May 2023	—N/a	56.6	45.3; 13	27.4; 7	10.7; 3	9.6; 2	17.9

=== Lugo ===
Polling firm/Commissioner	Fieldwork date	Sample size	Turnout	PP	PSdeG–PSOE	BNG	Cs	Vox	Lead
Sondaxe/La Voz de Galicia	14–21 May 2026	400	?	42.1; 13	27.6; 8	20.5; 6	–	3.9; 0	14.5
Celeste-Tel/PSOE	19 Apr 2026	600	63.5	43.5; 12	30.3; 9	17.7; 5	0.3; 0	5.9; 1	13.2
Sondaxe/La Voz de Galicia	12–22 May 2025	400	?	43.7; 12	26.1; 7	23.1; 6	–	–	17.6
DemosGal/PP	29 Apr–7 May 2025	400	?	46.4; 13/14	24.1; 7	19.3; 5/6	–	–	22.3
Sondaxe/La Voz de Galicia	13–22 May 2024	400	?	40.8; 12	28.4; 8	19.8; 5	–	–	12.4
2023 municipal election	28 May 2023	—N/a	64.3	43.6; 12	27.7; 8	19.9; 5	2.7; 0	2.3; 0	15.9

=== Monforte de Lemos ===
Polling firm/Commissioner	Fieldwork date	Sample size	Turnout	PSdeG–PSOE	PP	BNG	esperta	Lead
Sondaxe/La Voz de Galicia	15–29 Sep 2026	300	56.8	52.6; 10	22.3; 4	12.4; 2	7.1; 1	30.3
Sondaxe/La Voz de Galicia	13 Jun–8 Jul 2025	300	61.1	57.8; 10/11	21.4; 4	12.3; 2	5.3; 0/1	36.4
2023 municipal election	28 May 2023	—N/a	62.7	54.7; 10	25.5; 4	12.4; 2	5.8; 1	29.2

=== Ourense ===
Polling firm/Commissioner	Fieldwork date	Sample size	Turnout	DO	PP	PSdeG–PSOE	BNG	Vox	Lead
Quadernas Consultoría/BNG	4 Jul 2026	600	?	30.7; 9	23.1; 7	15.7; 4	24.1; 7	1.8; 0	6.6
Sondaxe/La Voz de Galicia	14–21 May 2026	400	?	28.4; 8	26.6; 8	19.9; 6	19.3; 5	2.3; 0	1.8
GAD3/La Región	10–12 Feb 2026	602	?	32.5; 9/10	24.2; 7	17.3; 5	19.7; 5/6	–	8.3
Celeste-Tel/DO	16–30 Jun 2025	600	65.1	37.2; 11	26.9; 8	16.2; 4	15.0; 4	1.5; 0	10.3
Sondaxe/La Voz de Galicia	12–22 May 2025	400	?	32.2; 10	24.4; 7	17.9; 5	19.2; 5	–	7.8
Sondaxe/La Voz de Galicia	13–22 May 2024	400	?	33.0; 10	24.5; 7	17.6; 5	18.2; 5	–	8.5
2023 municipal election	28 May 2023	—N/a	65.8	33.7; 10	25.0; 7	19.3; 6	15.7; 4	1.8; 0	8.7

=== Pontevedra ===
Polling firm/Commissioner	Fieldwork date	Sample size	Turnout	PP	BNG	PSdeG–PSOE	Lead
Sondaxe/La Voz de Galicia	14–21 May 2026	400	?	40.1; 11	31.7; 9	19.6; 5	8.4
Sondaxe/La Voz de Galicia	12–22 May 2025	400	?	41.0; 11	32.7; 9	17.8; 5	8.3
Sondaxe/La Voz de Galicia	13–22 May 2024	400	?	42.3; 11	32.1; 9	19.7; 5	10.2
2023 municipal election	28 May 2023	—N/a	63.0	38.9; 11	31.4; 9	17.7; 5	7.5

=== Santiago de Compostela ===
Polling firm/Commissioner	Fieldwork date	Sample size	Turnout	PP	BNG	PSdeG–PSOE	Compostela Aberta	Lead
Sondaxe/La Voz de Galicia	14–21 May 2026	400	?	41.2; 13	24.7; 7	18.5; 5	7.7; 2	16.5
Sondaxe/La Voz de Galicia	12–22 May 2025	400	?	39.6; 11	26.8; 7	17.9; 5	9.1; 2	12.8
Sondaxe/La Voz de Galicia	13–22 May 2024	400	?	39.2; 11	28.5; 8	17.2; 4	9.1; 2	10.7
2023 municipal election	28 May 2023	—N/a	61.9	37.7; 11	23.6; 6	21.7; 6	9.2; 2	14.1

=== Vigo ===
Polling firm/Commissioner	Fieldwork date	Sample size	Turnout	PSdeG–PSOE	PP	BNG	Lead
Sondaxe/La Voz de Galicia	14–21 May 2026	400	?	58.0; 18	19.7; 6	12.7; 3	38.3
Sondaxe/La Voz de Galicia	12–22 May 2025	400	?	58.7; 18	19.3; 5	13.6; 4	39.4
Sondaxe/La Voz de Galicia	13–22 May 2024	400	?	62.4; 19	18.8; 5	13.0; 3	43.6
2023 municipal election	28 May 2023	—N/a	57.5	60.9; 19	18.6; 5	11.1; 3	42.3

=== Vilagarcía de Arousa ===
Polling firm/Commissioner	Fieldwork date	Sample size	Turnout	PP	PSdeG–PSOE	BNG	EU	Lead
Sondaxe/La Voz de Galicia	1–9 Jul 2024	300	?	38.2; 9	35.5; 8	13.3; 3	6.4; 1	2.7
2023 municipal election	28 May 2023	—N/a	58.5	36.3; 9	36.1; 9	11.9; 2	6.2; 1	0.2
