= Opinion polling for the 2023 Spanish local elections (Valencian Community) =

In the run up to the 2023 Spanish local elections, various organisations carried out opinion polling to gauge voting intention in local entities in Spain. Results of such polls for municipalities in the Valencian Community are displayed in this article. The date range for these opinion polls is from the previous local elections, held on 26 May 2019, to the day the next elections were held, on 28 May 2023.

Polls are listed in reverse chronological order, showing the most recent first and using the dates when the survey fieldwork was done, as opposed to the date of publication. Where the fieldwork dates are unknown, the date of publication is given instead. The highest percentage figure in each polling survey is displayed with its background shaded in the leading party's colour. If a tie ensues, this is applied to the figures with the highest percentages. The "Lead" columns on the right shows the percentage-point difference between the parties with the highest percentages in a given poll.

== Municipalities ==
=== Alicante ===
Color key:

Poll conducted after legal ban on opinion polls

Polling firm/Commissioner	Fieldwork date	Sample size	Turnout	PP	PSPV	CS	Unidas Podemos	Compromís	Vox	Lead
2023 municipal election	28 May 2023	—N/a	61.1	40.7; 14	25.9; 8	3.2; 0	5.0; 1	7.4; 2	14.3; 4	14.8
GAD3/RTVE–FORTA	28 May 2023	?	?	43.0; 13/14	25.0; 8	1.0; 0	5.0; 1	9.0; 2/3	14.0; 4	18.0
GIPEyOP/UV	10–20 May 2023	?	?	35.1; 9/12	29.9; 8/10	5.4; 0/2	8.4; 1/3	9.4; 2/3	9.5; 2/3	5.2
Sigma Dos/Las Provincias	11–17 May 2023	?	?	? 12/13	? 8/9	? 0	? 2	? 2	? 4	?
GIPEyOP/UV	10–17 May 2023	?	?	37.6; 10/14	27.8; 7/10	2.1; 0	7.0; 1/3	9.4; 1/4	13.1; 2/5	9.8
Demoscopia y Servicios/ESdiario	3–5 Oct 2022	?	?	34.8; 12	31.3; 10	3.2; 0	3.9; 0	6.8; 2	15.9; 5	3.5
Demoscopia y Servicios/ESdiario	23–25 May 2022	1,800	?	34.8; 11	28.8; 9	2.2; 0	5.4; 1	7.5; 2	18.7; 6	6.0
GAD3/Cs	30 Jan 2022	?	?	38.3; 12	28.5; 9	5.4; 1	6.5; 2	6.1; 2	11.2; 3	9.8
Demoscopia y Servicios/ESdiario	8 Oct 2021	?	?	35.3; 11	29.6; 10	2.1; 0	4.7; 0	9.4; 3	15.6; 5	5.7
Demoscopia y Servicios/ESdiario	21–25 Jun 2021	?	?	? 12	? 9	? 0	? 1	? 3	? 4	?
Demoscopia y Servicios/ESdiario	1–5 Mar 2021	1,800	?	31.3; 10	29.6; 9	6.1; 2	6.1; 1	8.7; 2	16.2; 5	1.7
Demoscopia y Servicios/ESdiario	1–7 Oct 2020	?	63.0	32.8; 10	28.1; 9	9.0; 2	8.2; 2	7.7; 2	12.1; 4	4.7
ElectoPanel/Electomanía	1 Apr–15 Jun 2020	?	?	34.9; 11	29.0; 9	7.1; 2	9.6; 3	5.9; 1	10.9; 3	5.9
SyM Consulting/EPDA	5–6 Jun 2020	530	?	26.4; 8	29.8; 9/10	9.4; 3	5.1; 1	6.8; 2	18.5; 5/6	3.4
2019 municipal election	26 May 2019	—N/a	56.0	29.3; 9	27.6; 9	16.5; 5	9.1; 2	6.7; 2	6.4; 2	1.7

=== Benicarló ===
Polling firm/Commissioner	Fieldwork date	Sample size	Turnout	PSPV	PP	CS	Compromís	EUPV	Podemos	Vox	Unidas Podemos	TxB	Lead
2023 municipal election	28 May 2023	—N/a	64.4	23.4; 5	29.9; 7	4.4; 0	11.7; 3	(Note: Within Unidas Podemos.)		9.4; 2	3.8; 0	16.2; 4	6.5
MGSM	12–25 Jul 2022	150	?	36.3; 9	29.3; 7	11.6; 2	8.7; 2	–	–	7.9; 1	–	–	7.0
2019 municipal election	26 May 2019	—N/a	61.8	48.3; 11	21.7; 5	13.0; 3	9.2; 2	3.8; 0	3.2; 0	–	–	–	26.6

=== Burjassot ===
Polling firm/Commissioner	Fieldwork date	Sample size	Turnout	PSPV	PP	CS	Compromís	Podemos	Vox	EUPV	Unidas Podemos	Lead
2023 municipal election	28 May 2023	—N/a	63.9	52.6; 12	19.5; 4	1.7; 0	9.2; 2		10.4; 2		5.3; 1	33.1
La Fontaine School	24 Apr 2023	?	?	48.7; 11	12.8; 2/3	3.2; 0	8.6; 1/2		21.4; 4/5		5.3; 1	27.3
2019 municipal election	26 May 2019	—N/a	59.7	47.2; 12	14.8; 3	10.9; 2	10.8; 2	7.0; 1	5.0; 1	3.3; 0	–	32.4

=== Burriana ===
Polling firm/Commissioner	Fieldwork date	Sample size	Turnout	PSPV	PP	Compromís	Vox	CS	Lead
2023 municipal election	28 May 2023	—N/a	65.9	30.6; 7	35.3; 8	10.9; 2	18.1; 4	–	4.7
Demoscopia y Servicios/ESdiario	29 Sep–1 Oct 2021	?	?	36.7; 9	29.2; 7	10.4; 2	11.4; 3	2.7; 0	7.5
2019 municipal election	26 May 2019	—N/a	63.6	39.0; 10	25.9; 6	9.5; 2	7.8; 2	6.3; 1	13.1

=== Castellón de la Plana ===
Color key:

Poll conducted after legal ban on opinion polls

Polling firm/Commissioner	Fieldwork date	Sample size	Turnout	PSPV	PP	CS	Compromís	Unidas Podemos	Vox	Som CS	Lead
2023 municipal election	28 May 2023	—N/a	65.4	28.3; 9	35.9; 11	2.2; 0	11.9; 3	3.4; 0	13.4; 4	2.6; 0	7.6
GAD3/RTVE–FORTA	28 May 2023	?	?	30.0; 9/10	33.0; 10/11	2.0; 0	10.0; 3	>5.0; 0	15.0; 3	–	3.0
GIPEyOP/UV	10–20 May 2023	?	?	32.5; 9/12	31.6; 9/12	3.1; 0	11.1; 2/4	5.9; 0/2	7.6; 1/3	? 0/1	0.9
GIPEyOP/UV	10–17 May 2023	?	?	32.1; 8/11	33.7; 8/12	1.5; 0	11.9; 2/4	5.9; 0/2	11.0; 2/4	–	1.6
SyM Consulting/EPDA	13–16 Apr 2023	842	59.5	27.4; 8	29.6; 9	0.6; 0	12.6; 3/4	5.8; 1	8.8; 2	12.7; 3/4	2.2
40dB/Radio Castellón	20–22 Mar 2023	400	?	37.2; 12	32.1; 10	4.4; 0	10.9; 3	5.3; 1	5.8; 1	–	5.1
SyM Consulting/EPDA	22–24 Oct 2022	697	60.2	28.6; 8/9	37.4; 11/12	0.9; 0	13.5; 4	5.6; 1	8.8; 2	–	8.8
Demoscopia y Servicios/ESdiario	3–5 Oct 2022	?	?	33.9; 10	31.4; 10	2.6; 0	10.8; 3	2.7; 0	15.5; 4	–	2.5
Demoscopia y Servicios/ESdiario	23–25 May 2022	?	63.0	31.7; 10	28.5; 8	2.5; 0	11.4; 3	3.8; 0	19.4; 6	–	3.2
SyM Consulting/AV	4 Apr 2022	700	?	? 9	? 11	–	? 4	–	? 3	–	?
EM-Analytics/Electomanía	22 Oct 2021	?	?	30.4; 9	30.1; 9	3.1; 0	13.7; 4	4.9; 0	15.9; 5	–	0.3
Demoscopia y Servicios/ESdiario	29 Sep–1 Oct 2021	?	?	29.8; 9	30.4; 10	3.4; 0	12.0; 3	4.2; 0	17.6; 5	–	0.6
Demoscopia y Servicios/ESdiario	21–25 Jun 2021	?	66.2	30.6; 10	29.3; 9	3.9; 0	11.6; 3	4.2; 0	18.2; 5	–	1.3
Demoscopia y Servicios/ESdiario	1–5 Mar 2021	1,800	66.0	35.4; 10	24.2; 7	7.1; 2	10.8; 3	3.9; 0	16.3; 5	–	11.2
Demoscopia y Servicios/ESdiario	1–7 Oct 2020	?	66.0	36.8; 11	23.1; 7	8.9; 2	12.4; 3	5.3; 1	11.0; 3	–	13.7
SyM Consulting/EPDA	5–6 Jun 2020	557	?	32.5; 9/10	23.8; 7	7.6; 2	7.3; 2	8.4; 2	16.3; 4/5	–	8.7
2019 municipal election	26 May 2019	—N/a	60.6	34.8; 10	24.0; 7	14.1; 4	11.7; 3	6.5; 2	6.4; 1	–	10.8

=== Elche ===
Color key:

Poll conducted after legal ban on opinion polls

Polling firm/Commissioner	Fieldwork date	Sample size	Turnout	PSPV	PP	CS	Compromís	Vox	Podemos	Unidas Podemos	Lead
2023 municipal election	28 May 2023	—N/a	66.2	38.7; 12	37.4; 11	1.2; 0	5.5; 1	11.4; 3		2.1; 0	9.1
GAD3/RTVE–FORTA	28 May 2023	?	?	37.0; 12	33.0; 10	1.0; 0	6.0; 1/2	14.0; 3/4		–	4.0
Sigma Dos/Todo Alicante	11–17 May 2023	500	?	40.6; 12/13	31.7; 9/10	2.0; 0	4.0; 0/1	11.5; 3/4		4.5; 0/1	8.9
Demoscopia y Servicios/ESdiario	8–12 May 2023	?	?	35.2; 11	34.2; 11	3.0; 0	6.4; 2	9.3; 3		4.8; 0	1.0
SyM Consulting/Diario de Alicante	20–26 Mar 2023	757	?	37.0; 11	37.0; 11	–	6.0; 2	9.0; 3	–	–	Tie
Celeste-Tel/PSOE	15 Mar 2023	600	?	41.3; 13	33.7; 10	3.5; 0	6.9; 2	7.6; 2	3.0; 0	–	7.6
Demoscopia y Servicios/ESdiario	3–5 Oct 2022	1,800	65.2	34.9; 11	32.3; 10	3.1; 0	6.1; 1	15.8; 5	3.1; 0	–	2.6
SyM Consulting/Diario de Alicante	28 Sep–1 Oct 2022	804	?	35.3; 11	36.0; 11	? 0	? 2	? 3	–	–	0.7
Demoscopia y Servicios/Alicante Plaza	24–25 May 2022	800	?	33.0; 10	30.7; 10	3.1; 0	6.8; 2	18.3; 5	2.9; 0	–	2.3
SyM Consulting/Diario de Alicante	17 Jan 2022	800	?	? 11	? 11	? 0	? 2	? 3	–	–	Tie
Demoscopia y Servicios/ESdiario	21–24 Sep 2021	?	?	35.2; 11	34.0; 11	2.4; 0	6.9; 2	11.4; 3	? 0	–	1.2
Demoscopia y Servicios/ESdiario	1–7 Oct 2020	?	?	39.3; 13	31.7; 10	4.1; 0	5.2; 1	10.8; 3	? 0	–	7.6
2019 municipal election	26 May 2019	—N/a	59.6	36.8; 12	27.7; 9	8.9; 2	6.5; 2	5.9; 2	4.6; 0	–	9.1

=== Elda ===
Polling firm/Commissioner	Fieldwork date	Sample size	Turnout	PSPV	PP	CS	Vox	EUPV	Compromís	EpT	Lead
2023 municipal election	28 May 2023	—N/a	62.4	44.5; 12	31.4; 9	4.3; 0	9.7; 2	(Note: Within Elda para Todas.)		7.2; 2	13.1
Demoscopia y Servicios/ESdiario	6–8 Jul 2022	600	65.0	39.8; 12	29.7; 8	2.4; 0	15.1; 4	5.9; 1	2.8; 0	–	10.1
2019 municipal election	26 May 2019	—N/a	60.6	40.2; 13	18.2; 5	16.2; 5	5.6; 1	5.1; 1	4.5; 0	–	22.0

=== Gandia ===
Polling firm/Commissioner	Fieldwork date	Sample size	Turnout	PSPV	PP	MG	CS	Vox	Podemos	Lead
2023 municipal election	28 May 2023	—N/a	67.2	41.5; 12	34.7; 10	9.0; 2	0.5; 0	6.7; 1	(Note: Within Més Gandia.)	6.8
Gandia.com/Televisió Comarcal	3–7 Feb 2023	300	?	35.1; 10/11	38.2; 11/12	9.1; 2	1.0; 0	5.5; 0/1	1.4; 0	3.1
Demoscopia y Servicios/ESdiario	14–15 Jul 2022	400	67.0	36.8; 10	34.6; 9	10.6; 3	2.1; 0	11.1; 3	2.8; 0	2.2
2019 municipal election	26 May 2019	—N/a	65.7	35.8; 11	32.3; 9	14.0; 4	5.5; 1	4.4; 0	3.3; 0	3.5

=== Orihuela ===
Polling firm/Commissioner	Fieldwork date	Sample size	Turnout	PP	PSPV	CS	Unidas Podemos	Vox	Compromís	PIOC	CO	Lead
2023 municipal election	28 May 2023	—N/a	60.0	38.6; 10	21.9; 6	11.0; 3	(Note: Within Cambiemos Orihuela.)	14.1; 4		4.6; 0	7.9; 2	16.7
Demoscopia y Servicios/ESdiario	5–9 May 2022	700	?	38.9; 11	22.7; 6	10.8; 3		9.7; 2		5.7; 1	10.2; 2	16.2
2019 municipal election	26 May 2019	—N/a	60.0	33.8; 9	23.2; 6	19.1; 5	13.2; 3	6.9; 2	2.7; 0	–	–	10.6

=== Oropesa del Mar ===
Polling firm/Commissioner	Fieldwork date	Sample size	Turnout	PSPV	PP	CS	Compromís	Vox	Lead
2023 municipal election	28 May 2023	—N/a	63.8	39.1; 7	30.9; 6	7.7; 1	7.6; 1	10.8; 2	8.2
Demoscopia y Servicios/ESdiario	4–7 Nov 2022	?	65.0	33.9; 6/7	42.8; 8/9	3.6; 0	7.9; 1	5.9; 0/1	8.9
2019 municipal election	26 May 2019	—N/a	61.2	33.3; 5	32.2; 5	13.0; 2	11.4; 1	5.7; 0	1.1

=== Paterna ===
Polling firm/Commissioner	Fieldwork date	Sample size	Turnout	PSPV	PP	CS	Compromís	Vox	Podemos	EUPV	Unidas Podemos	Lead
2023 municipal election	28 May 2023	—N/a	66.9	48.6; 14	23.6; 6	1.4; 0	8.2; 2	13.2; 3			3.0; 0	25.0
Demoscopia y Servicios/ESdiario	5–8 May 2023	700	?	35.4; 11	29.8; 9	1.3; 0	8.9; 2	12.7; 3			2.8; 0	5.6
2019 municipal election	26 May 2019	—N/a	60.7	47.4; 13	14.4; 4	13.0; 3	10.7; 3	7.0; 2	4.1; 0	2.7; 0	–	33.0

=== Sagunto ===
Polling firm/Commissioner	Fieldwork date	Sample size	Turnout	PSPV	Compromís	IP	PP	EUPV	CS	Vox	Podemos	Unidas Podemos	Lead
2023 municipal election	28 May 2023	—N/a	63.7	43.5; 12	7.8; 2	11.9; 3	19.0; 5		1.0; 0	7.9; 2		7.1; 1	24.5
IP	9–12 May 2023	350	?	24.9; 7/8	12.9; 3	22.6; 6/7	19.7; 5/6		? 0	? 0		9.1; 2	2.3
2019 municipal election	26 May 2019	—N/a	60.8	23.3; 7	18.2; 5	16.6; 5	12.5; 3	9.3; 2	8.4; 2	5.4; 1	4.7; 0	–	5.1

=== Torrent ===
Polling firm/Commissioner	Fieldwork date	Sample size	Turnout	PSPV	PP	CS	Compromís	Vox	Podemos	UxT	Lead
2023 municipal election	28 May 2023	—N/a	65.9	37.5; 10	33.3; 9	3.0; 0	(Note: Within Unides per Torrent.)	14.2; 4		8.9; 2	4.2
Demoscopia y Servicios/ESdiario	11–12 Jul 2022	400	64.0	34.5; 10	34.1; 10	2.2; 0	9.7; 2	13.4; 3	2.9; 0	–	0.4
SyM Consulting/EPDA	22–25 Jun 2022	697	54.5	30.2; 8/9	36.6; 10/11	0.8; 0	12.4; 3	12.0; 3	2.9; 0	–	6.4
2019 municipal election	26 May 2019	—N/a	58.5	40.0; 11	26.9; 8	9.0; 2	8.3; 2	7.2; 2	3.7; 0	–	13.1

=== La Vall d'Uixó ===
Polling firm/Commissioner	Fieldwork date	Sample size	Turnout	PSPV	PP	EUPV	CS	Compromís	Vox	Podemos	Unidas Podemos	Lead
2023 municipal election	28 May 2023	—N/a	71.2	37.5; 9	35.2; 8		0.9; 0	8.7; 2	6.6; 1		7.6; 1	2.3
Demoscopia y Servicios/ESdiario	2–6 May 2023	?	?	36.8; 9/10	24.1; 5		7.2; 1	6.3; 1	9.6; 2		12.7; 3	12.7
Demoscopia y Servicios/ESdiario	3 Oct 2022	?	67.6	37.3; 9/10	23.2; 5/6	14.1; 3	3.5; 0	3.7; 0	15.3; 3	–	–	14.1
Demoscopia y Servicios/ESdiario	21–25 Jun 2021	?	70.1	34.7; 8	29.2; 7	10.2; 2	3.1; 0	8.1; 2	10.8; 2	–	–	5.5
2019 municipal election	26 May 2019	—N/a	68.8	37.4; 9	22.1; 5	12.0; 3	8.2; 2	7.4; 1	6.6; 1	3.0; 1	–	15.3

=== Villarreal ===
Polling firm/Commissioner	Fieldwork date	Sample size	Turnout	PSPV	PP	Compromís	CS	Vox	Unidas Podemos	Lead
2023 municipal election	28 May 2023	—N/a	65.2	39.2; 11	29.7; 8	11.6; 3	3.2; 0	11.1; 3	3.4; 0	9.5
40dB/Cadena SER	20–24 Feb 2023	400	?	46.7; 13	24.7; 7	10.4; 2/3	3.8; 0	8.3; 2	5.0; 0/1	22.0
Celeste-Tel/PSOE	31 Jan–6 Feb 2023	450	?	45.5; 12	25.1; 7	10.8; 3	4.6; 0	8.4; 2	5.2; 1	20.4
Demoscopia y Servicios/ESdiario	1–5 Mar 2021	1,800	65.0	45.6; 12	19.6; 5	10.7; 3	7.2; 2	11.4; 3	4.5; 0	26.0
2019 municipal election	26 May 2019	—N/a	62.5	46.3; 13	20.2; 5	11.0; 3	10.6; 2	5.5; 1	5.4; 1	26.1

=== Villena ===
Polling firm/Commissioner	Fieldwork date	Sample size	Turnout	PP	PSPV	LV	CS	Vox	EUPV	Unidas Podemos	Lead
2023 municipal election	28 May 2023	—N/a	66.9	40.0; 9	34.6; 8	14.5; 3	–	5.9; 1		3.5; 0	3.1
Demoscopia y Servicios/ESdiario	7–8 Jul 2022	300	68.0	31.1; 7	27.5; 7	18.3; 4	2.9; 0	13.2; 3	3.8; 0	–	3.6
2019 municipal election	26 May 2019	—N/a	66.7	29.3; 7	26.2; 7	21.0; 5	8.3; 2	4.6; 0	4.1; 0	–	3.1

=== Vinaròs ===
Polling firm/Commissioner	Fieldwork date	Sample size	Turnout	PSPV	PP	PVI	Unidas Podemos	Compromís	CS	Vox	Lead
2023 municipal election	28 May 2023	—N/a	62.0	35.5; 9	29.6; 7	9.9; 2	4.9; 0	6.1; 1	–	7.6; 2	5.9
MG Social Marketing	30 Jan–11 Feb 2021	277	60	25.4; 6	24.7; 6	12.1; 3	11.6; 3	6.7; 1	3.3; 0	9.0; 2	0.7
2019 municipal election	26 May 2019	—N/a	62.0	29.9; 7	25.5; 6	15.6; 3	13.5 (Note: Results for Totes i Tots Som Vinaròs.); 3	5.7; 2	5.2; 1	–	4.4
