= 2011 Spanish local elections in Extremadura =

This article presents the results breakdown of the local elections held in Extremadura on 22 May 2011. The following tables show detailed results in the autonomous community's most populous municipalities, sorted alphabetically.

== City control ==
The following table lists party control in the most populous municipalities, including provincial capitals (shown in bold). Gains for a party are displayed with the cell's background shaded in that party's colour.

Municipality	Population	Previous control	New control
**Almendralejo**	30,741	Spanish Socialist Workers' Party (PSOE)	People's Party (PP)
**Badajoz**	150,376	People's Party (PP)	People's Party (PP)
**Cáceres**	94,179	Spanish Socialist Workers' Party (PSOE)	People's Party (PP)
Mérida	57,127	Spanish Socialist Workers' Party (PSOE)	People's Party (PP)
Plasencia	41,447	Spanish Socialist Workers' Party (PSOE)	People's Party (PP)

== Municipalities ==
=== Almendralejo ===
Population: 30,741

← Summary of the 22 May 2011 City Council of Almendralejo election results →
Parties and alliances	Popular vote			Seats	
Parties and alliances	Votes	%	±pp	Total	+/−
People's Party (PP)	9,007	52.91	+25.40	**12**	+6
Spanish Socialist Workers' Party (PSOE)	6,302	37.02	−27.84	**8**	−6
United Left–Greens–Independent Socialists of Extremadura (IU–V–SIEx)	898	5.28	−0.10	**1**	±0
For a Fairer World (PUM+J)	163	0.96	New	0	±0
National Democracy (DN)	150	0.88	New	0	±0
United Extremadura (EU)	136	0.80	New	0	±0
Blank ballots	366	2.15	−0.10		
**Total**	**17,022**			**21**	**±0**
Valid votes	17,022	98.98	−0.02		
Invalid votes	175	1.02	+0.02		
**Votes cast / turnout**	**17,197**	**70.87**	**+3.32**		
Abstentions	7,070	29.13	−3.32		
**Registered voters**	**24,267**				

=== Badajoz ===
Population: 150,376

← Summary of the 22 May 2011 City Council of Badajoz election results →
Parties and alliances	Popular vote			Seats	
Parties and alliances	Votes	%	±pp	Total	+/−
People's Party (PP)	41,441	56.82	+7.23	**17**	+2
Spanish Socialist Workers' Party (PSOE)	20,404	27.98	−9.95	**8**	−3
United Left–Greens–Independent Socialists of Extremadura (IU–V–SIEx)^{1}	5,245	7.19	+0.81	**2**	+1
Union, Progress and Democracy (UPyD)	2,603	3.57	New	0	±0
Ecolo–Greens (Ecolo)	504	0.69	New	0	±0
For a Fairer World (PUM+J)	491	0.67	New	0	±0
Anti-Bullfighting Party Against Mistreatment of Animals (PACMA)	284	0.39	New	0	±0
United Extremadura (EU)	206	0.28	New	0	±0
Spanish Alternative (AES)	129	0.18	New	0	±0
Humanist Party (PH)	101	0.14	−0.08	0	±0
Blank ballots	1,525	2.09	+0.23		
**Total**	**72,933**			**27**	**±0**
Valid votes	72,933	98.87	−0.62		
Invalid votes	836	1.13	+0.62		
**Votes cast / turnout**	**73,769**	**63.57**	**+3.24**		
Abstentions	42,268	36.43	−3.24		
**Registered voters**	**116,037**				
Sources
Footnotes: ^{1} United Left–Greens–Independent Socialists of Extremadura results are compared to the combined totals of United Left and The Greens of Extremadura in the 2007 election.

=== Cáceres ===
Population: 94,179

← Summary of the 22 May 2011 City Council of Cáceres election results →
Parties and alliances	Popular vote			Seats	
Parties and alliances	Votes	%	±pp	Total	+/−
People's Party–United Extremadura (PP–EU)	29,013	56.57	+10.37	**16**	+4
Spanish Socialist Workers' Party (PSOE)	12,450	24.28	−15.30	**7**	−4
United Left–Greens–Independent Socialists of Extremadura (IU–V–SIEx)	4,022	7.84	+2.44	**2**	+1
Union, Progress and Democracy (UPyD)	2,294	4.47	New	0	±0
Ecolo–Greens (Ecolo)	914	1.78	New	0	±0
Citizen Forum of Cáceres (FCC)	824	1.61	−4.94	0	−1
Convergence for Extremadura (CEx)	343	0.67	New	0	±0
Blank ballots	1,424	2.78	+0.52		
**Total**	**51,284**			**25**	**±0**
Valid votes	51,284	97.77	−1.45		
Invalid votes	1,171	2.23	+1.45		
**Votes cast / turnout**	**52,455**	**70.22**	**+1.09**		
Abstentions	22,247	29.78	−1.09		
**Registered voters**	**74,702**				

=== Mérida ===
Population: 57,127

← Summary of the 22 May 2011 City Council of Mérida election results →
Parties and alliances	Popular vote			Seats	
Parties and alliances	Votes	%	±pp	Total	+/−
People's Party (PP)	13,848	44.98	−0.29	**13**	+1
Spanish Socialist Workers' Party (PSOE)	11,357	36.89	−10.91	**10**	−3
United Left–Greens (IU–V)^{1}	1,843	5.99	+1.70	**1**	+1
Independent Socialists of Extremadura (SIEx)	1,555	5.05	New	**1**	+1
Union, Progress and Democracy (UPyD)	556	1.81	New	0	±0
Ecolo–Greens (Ecolo)	463	1.50	New	0	±0
United Extremadura (EU)	222	0.72	New	0	±0
For a Fairer World (PUM+J)	129	0.42	New	0	±0
Blank ballots	817	2.65	+0.88		
**Total**	**30,790**			**25**	**±0**
Valid votes	30,790	98.62	−0.87		
Invalid votes	430	1.38	+0.87		
**Votes cast / turnout**	**31,220**	**69.58**	**−1.34**		
Abstentions	13,646	30.42	+1.34		
**Registered voters**	**44,866**				
Sources
Footnotes: ^{1} United Left–Greens results are compared to the combined totals of United Left–Independent Socialists of Extremadura and The Greens of Extremadura in the 2007 election.

=== Plasencia ===
Population: 41,447

← Summary of the 22 May 2011 City Council of Plasencia election results →
Parties and alliances	Popular vote			Seats	
Parties and alliances	Votes	%	±pp	Total	+/−
People's Party–United Extremadura (PP–EU)	11,959	55.21	+13.89	**13**	+3
Spanish Socialist Workers' Party (PSOE)	5,275	24.35	−20.33	**6**	−4
United Left–Greens–Independent Socialists of Extremadura (IU–V–SIEx)	1,680	7.76	+3.03	**1**	+1
Extremaduran People's Union (UPEx)	1,262	5.83	−1.38	**1**	±0
Union, Progress and Democracy (UPyD)	629	2.90	New	0	±0
Convergence for Extremadura (CEx)	285	1.32	New	0	±0
Blank ballots	571	2.64	+0.58		
**Total**	**21,661**			**21**	**±0**
Valid votes	21,661	97.97	−0.83		
Invalid votes	449	2.03	+0.83		
**Votes cast / turnout**	**22,110**	**68.12**	**−0.14**		
Abstentions	10,347	31.88	+0.14		
**Registered voters**	**32,457**				

== See also ==
- 2011 Extremaduran regional election
