= 2015 Spanish local elections in Extremadura =

This article presents the results breakdown of the local elections held in Extremadura on 24 May 2015. The following tables show detailed results in the autonomous community's most populous municipalities, sorted alphabetically.

== City control ==
The following table lists party control in the most populous municipalities, including provincial capitals (shown in bold). Gains for a party are displayed with the cell's background shaded in that party's colour.

Municipality	Population	Previous control	New control
Almendralejo	35,014	People's Party (PP)	People's Party (PP)
**Badajoz**	150,517	People's Party (PP)	People's Party (PP)
**Cáceres**	95,855	People's Party (PP)	People's Party (PP)
Mérida	58,985	People's Party (PP)	Spanish Socialist Workers' Party (PSOE)
Plasencia	40,892	People's Party (PP)	People's Party (PP)

== Municipalities ==
=== Almendralejo ===
Population: 35,014

← Summary of the 24 May 2015 City Council of Almendralejo election results →
Parties and alliances	Popular vote			Seats	
Parties and alliances	Votes	%	±pp	Total	+/−
People's Party (PP)	8,116	49.80	−3.11	**13**	+1
Spanish Socialist Workers' Party (PSOE)	4,902	30.08	−6.94	**8**	±0
Almendralejo Takes the Floor (Ganemos–IU–LV)	781	4.79	−0.49	0	−1
Citizens–Party of the Citizenry (C's)	727	4.46	New	0	±0
In Common Almendralejo (En Común)	553	3.39	New	0	±0
Union, Progress and Democracy (UPyD)	331	2.03	New	0	±0
Extremadurans (eXtremeños)	325	1.99	New	0	±0
Party for Freedom with Clean Hands (PXL)^{1}	239	1.47	+0.59	0	±0
Blank ballots	323	1.98	−0.17		
**Total**	**16,297**			**21**	**±0**
Valid votes	16,297	98.20	−0.78		
Invalid votes	299	1.80	+0.78		
**Votes cast / turnout**	**16,596**	**66.80**	**−4.07**		
Abstentions	8,248	33.20	+4.07		
**Registered voters**	**24,844**				
Sources
Footnotes: ^{1} Party for Freedom with Clean Hands results are compared to Nationals Democracy totals in the 2011 election.

=== Badajoz ===
Population: 150,517

← Summary of the 24 May 2015 City Council of Badajoz election results →
Parties and alliances	Popular vote			Seats	
Parties and alliances	Votes	%	±pp	Total	+/−
People's Party (PP)	27,953	39.55	−17.27	**13**	−4
Spanish Socialist Workers' Party (PSOE)	21,399	30.27	+2.29	**9**	+1
Recover Badajoz (RecuperarBadajoz)	7,360	10.41	New	**3**	+3
Citizens–Party of the Citizenry (C's)	4,994	7.07	New	**2**	+2
Forward Badajoz (BA)	2,083	2.95	New	0	±0
Let's Win–United Left–The Greens (Ganemos–IU–LV)	2,017	2.85	−4.34	0	−2
Badajoz in Common (Badajoz en Común)	1,289	1.82	New	0	±0
Union, Progress and Democracy (UPyD)	1,087	1.54	−2.03	0	±0
Extremadurans (eXtremeños)	515	0.73	New	0	±0
Vox (Vox)	381	0.54	New	0	±0
United Extremadura (EU)	265	0.37	+0.09	0	±0
Humanist Party (PH)	91	0.13	−0.01	0	±0
Blank ballots	1,250	1.77	−0.32		
**Total**	**70,684**			**27**	**±0**
Valid votes	70,684	98.61	−0.26		
Invalid votes	994	1.39	+0.26		
**Votes cast / turnout**	**71,678**	**61.34**	**−2.23**		
Abstentions	45,181	38.66	+2.23		
**Registered voters**	**116,859**				

=== Cáceres ===
Population: 95,855

← Summary of the 24 May 2015 City Council of Cáceres election results →
Parties and alliances	Popular vote			Seats	
Parties and alliances	Votes	%	±pp	Total	+/−
People's Party (PP)	17,456	34.47	−22.10	**11**	−5
Spanish Socialist Workers' Party (PSOE)	13,986	27.62	+3.34	**8**	+1
Citizens–Party of the Citizenry (C's)	7,055	13.93	New	**4**	+4
You Are Cáceres (CAC)	4,448	8.78	New	**2**	+2
Coalition for Cáceres (CpC)	2,308	4.56	New	0	±0
Let's Win–United Left–The Greens (Ganemos–IU–LV)	1,923	3.80	−4.04	0	−2
Union, Progress and Democracy (UPyD)	927	1.83	−2.64	0	±0
United Extremadura (EU)	822	1.62	New	0	±0
Extremadurans (eXtremeños)^{1}	740	1.46	+0.79	0	±0
Blank ballots	975	1.93	−0.85		
**Total**	**50,640**			**25**	**±0**
Valid votes	50,640	97.85	+0.08		
Invalid votes	1,112	2.15	−0.08		
**Votes cast / turnout**	**51,752**	**67.80**	**−2.42**		
Abstentions	24,583	32.20	+2.42		
**Registered voters**	**76,335**				
Sources
Footnotes: ^{1} Extremadurans results are compared to Convergence for Extremadura totals in the 2011 election.

=== Mérida ===
Population: 58,985

← Summary of the 24 May 2015 City Council of Mérida election results →
Parties and alliances	Popular vote			Seats	
Parties and alliances	Votes	%	±pp	Total	+/−
Spanish Socialist Workers' Party (PSOE)^{1}	12,560	42.13	+0.19	**11**	±0
People's Party (PP)	8,443	28.32	−16.66	**8**	−5
Citizens–Party of the Citizenry (C's)	2,282	7.66	New	**2**	+2
Mérida Participates (Participa)	2,165	7.26	New	**2**	+2
Let's Win–United Left–The Greens (Ganemos–IU–LV)	2,103	7.05	+1.06	**2**	+1
Extremadurans (eXtremeños)	967	3.24	New	0	±0
Union, Progress and Democracy (UPyD)	551	1.85	+0.04	0	±0
Blank ballots	738	2.48	−0.17		
**Total**	**29,809**			**25**	**±0**
Valid votes	29,809	98.13	−0.49		
Invalid votes	568	1.87	+0.49		
**Votes cast / turnout**	**30,377**	**66.10**	**−3.48**		
Abstentions	15,582	33.90	+3.48		
**Registered voters**	**45,959**				
Sources
Footnotes: ^{1} Spanish Socialist Workers' Party results are compared to the combined totals of Spanish Socialist Workers' Party and Independent Socialists of Extremadura in the 2011 election.

=== Plasencia ===
Population: 40,892

← Summary of the 24 May 2015 City Council of Plasencia election results →
Parties and alliances	Popular vote			Seats	
Parties and alliances	Votes	%	±pp	Total	+/−
People's Party (PP)	8,700	42.13	−13.08	**11**	−2
Spanish Socialist Workers' Party (PSOE)	5,337	25.85	+1.50	**7**	+1
Citizens–Party of the Citizenry (C's)^{1}	1,426	6.91	+1.08	**1**	±0
Extremadurans (eXtremeños)^{2}	1,359	6.58	+5.26	**1**	+1
Plasencia in Common (PeC)	1,349	6.53	New	**1**	+1
Let's Win–United Left–The Greens Plasencia (Ganemos–IU–LV)	970	4.70	−3.06	0	−1
United Extremadura (EU)	398	1.93	New	0	±0
Union, Progress and Democracy (UPyD)	394	1.91	−0.99	0	±0
Independent Socialists of Extremadura (SIEx)	160	0.77	New	0	±0
Vox (Vox)	108	0.52	New	0	±0
Blank ballots	448	2.17	−0.47		
**Total**	**20,649**			**21**	**±0**
Valid votes	20,649	97.38	−0.59		
Invalid votes	556	2.62	+0.59		
**Votes cast / turnout**	**21,205**	**64.35**	**−3.77**		
Abstentions	11,750	35.65	+3.77		
**Registered voters**	**32,955**				
Sources
Footnotes: ^{1} Citizens–Party of the Citizenry results are compared to Extremaduran People's Union totals in the 2011 election.; ^{2} Extremadurans results are compared to Convergence for Extremadura totals in the 2011 election.

== See also ==
- 2015 Extremaduran regional election
