= 2023 Spanish local elections in Extremadura =

This article presents the results breakdown of the local elections held in Extremadura on 28 May 2023. The following tables show detailed results in the autonomous community's most populous municipalities, sorted alphabetically.

== City control ==
The following table lists party control in the most populous municipalities, including provincial capitals (shown in bold). Gains for a party are displayed with the cell's background shaded in that party's colour.

Municipality	Population	Previous control	New control
Almendralejo	33,669	Spanish Socialist Workers' Party (PSOE)	Spanish Socialist Workers' Party (PSOE)
**Badajoz**	150,146	People's Party (PP)	People's Party (PP)
**Cáceres**	95,456	Spanish Socialist Workers' Party (PSOE)	People's Party (PP)
Mérida	59,324	Spanish Socialist Workers' Party (PSOE)	Spanish Socialist Workers' Party (PSOE)
Plasencia	39,247	People's Party (PP)	People's Party (PP)

== Municipalities ==
=== Almendralejo ===
Population: 33,669

← Summary of the 28 May 2023 City Council of Almendralejo election results →
Parties and alliances	Popular vote			Seats	
Parties and alliances	Votes	%	±pp	Total	+/−
Spanish Socialist Workers' Party (PSOE)	7,535	46.16	+3.24	**11**	+1
People's Party (PP)	5,010	30.69	+2.21	**7**	±0
Vox (Vox)	2,128	13.04	+7.85	**3**	+2
Citizens–Party of the Citizenry (CS)	708	4.34	−8.48	0	−3
United for Almendralejo (Podemos–IU–AV–Unidas)^{1}	685	4.20	−0.42	0	±0
Blank ballots	259	1.59	+0.81		
**Total**	**16,325**			**21**	**±0**
Valid votes	16,325	98.27	−0.78		
Invalid votes	288	1.73	+0.78		
**Votes cast / turnout**	**16,613**	**66.28**	**+1.41**		
Abstentions	8,453	33.72	−1.41		
**Registered voters**	**25,066**				
Sources
Footnotes: ^{1} United for Almendralejo results are compared to the combined totals of We Can and United Left in the 2019 election.

=== Badajoz ===
Population: 150,146

← Summary of the 28 May 2023 City Council of Badajoz election results →
Parties and alliances	Popular vote			Seats	
Parties and alliances	Votes	%	±pp	Total	+/−
People's Party (PP)	32,942	44.43	+13.50	**14**	+5
Spanish Socialist Workers' Party (PSOE)	23,455	31.63	−5.87	**10**	−2
Vox (Vox)	7,559	10.19	+4.67	**3**	+2
United We Can Badajoz (Podemos–IU–AV–Unidas)	3,030	4.09	−1.63	0	−1
Together for Extremadura (JUEx)	2,274	3.07	New	0	±0
Forward Badajoz (BA)	1,468	1.98	−2.87	0	±0
Citizens–Party of the Citizenry (CS)	1,027	1.39	−11.76	0	−4
Badajoz 5 Stars (Badajoz 5 Estrellas)	854	1.15	New	0	±0
Raise Badajoz (Levanta)	244	0.33	New	0	±0
Extremennist Party–Extremennists–Party of Extremadurans (PEx–EXT)	199	0.27	New	0	±0
Blank ballots	1,094	1.48	+0.72		
**Total**	**74,146**			**27**	**±0**
Valid votes	74,146	98.63	−0.66		
Invalid votes	1,030	1.37	+0.66		
**Votes cast / turnout**	**75,176**	**63.19**	**+4.73**		
Abstentions	43,784	36.81	−4.73		
**Registered voters**	**118,960**				

=== Cáceres ===
Population: 95,456

← Summary of the 28 May 2023 City Council of Cáceres election results →
Parties and alliances	Popular vote			Seats	
Parties and alliances	Votes	%	±pp	Total	+/−
People's Party (PP)	20,446	40.09	+12.94	**11**	+4
Spanish Socialist Workers' Party (PSOE)	17,054	33.44	−1.02	**10**	+1
Vox (Vox)	4,641	9.10	+2.57	**2**	+1
United We Can for Cáceres (Podemos–IU–AV–Unidas)	3,414	6.69	−3.87	**2**	−1
Cáceres Alive (Cáceres Viva)	1,801	3.53	New	0	±0
Citizens–Party of the Citizenry (CS)	920	1.80	−17.44	0	−5
We Are Cáceres (Somos Cc)	698	1.37	New	0	±0
Raise Cáceres (Levanta)^{1}	593	1.16	+0.03	0	±0
Together for Extremadura (JUEx)	566	1.11	New	0	±0
A Worthy Extremadura (UED)	231	0.45	New	0	±0
Blank ballots	641	1.26	+0.32		
**Total**	**51,005**			**25**	**±0**
Valid votes	51,005	98.51	−0.49		
Invalid votes	770	1.49	+0.49		
**Votes cast / turnout**	**51,775**	**66.85**	**+2.01**		
Abstentions	25,672	33.15	−2.01		
**Registered voters**	**77,447**				
Sources
Footnotes: ^{1} Raise Cáceres results are compared to United Extremadura totals in the 2019 election.

=== Mérida ===
Population: 59,324

← Summary of the 28 May 2023 City Council of Mérida election results →
Parties and alliances	Popular vote			Seats	
Parties and alliances	Votes	%	±pp	Total	+/−
Spanish Socialist Workers' Party (PSOE)	14,208	48.55	−0.32	**14**	+1
People's Party (PP)	7,044	24.07	+4.99	**6**	+1
Vox (Vox)	2,584	8.83	+1.79	**2**	±0
For Mérida (XMérida)	2,103	7.19	New	**2**	+2
United for Mérida (IU–Podemos–AV–Unidas)	1,905	6.51	−2.84	**1**	−1
Citizens–Party of the Citizenry (CS)	451	1.54	−12.12	0	−3
Together for Extremadura (JUEx)	337	1.15	New	0	±0
A Worthy Extremadura (UED)	155	0.53	New	0	±0
Blank ballots	478	1.63	+0.55		
**Total**	**29,265**			**25**	**±0**
Valid votes	29,265	98.36	−0.85		
Invalid votes	489	1.64	+0.85		
**Votes cast / turnout**	**29,754**	**63.42**	**+2.78**		
Abstentions	17,165	36.58	−2.78		
**Registered voters**	**46,919**				

=== Plasencia ===
Population: 39,247

← Summary of the 28 May 2023 City Council of Plasencia election results →
Parties and alliances	Popular vote			Seats	
Parties and alliances	Votes	%	±pp	Total	+/−
People's Party (PP)	10,127	51.64	+1.17	**12**	±0
Spanish Socialist Workers' Party (PSOE)	4,749	24.21	−1.50	**6**	±0
United We Can for Plasencia (Podemos–IU–AV–Unidas)	1,798	9.17	+0.62	**2**	±0
Vox (Vox)	1,208	6.16	+3.92	**1**	+1
Raise Plasencia (Levanta)	679	3.46	New	0	±0
Together for Extremadura (JUEx)	374	1.91	New	0	±0
Extremennist Party–Extremennists–Party of Extremadurans (PEx–EXT)	243	1.24	New	0	±0
Citizens–Party of the Citizenry (CS)	126	0.64	−4.90	0	−1
Blank ballots	308	1.57	+0.65		
**Total**	**19,612**			**21**	**±0**
Valid votes	19,612	97.83	−1.27		
Invalid votes	436	2.17	+1.27		
**Votes cast / turnout**	**20,048**	**61.56**	**−0.74**		
Abstentions	12,517	38.44	+0.74		
**Registered voters**	**32,565**				

== See also ==
- 2023 Extremaduran regional election
