= 2019 Spanish local elections in Extremadura =

This article presents the results breakdown of the local elections held in Extremadura on 26 May 2019. The following tables show detailed results in the autonomous community's most populous municipalities, sorted alphabetically.

== City control ==
The following table lists party control in the most populous municipalities, including provincial capitals (shown in bold). Gains for a party are displayed with the cell's background shaded in that party's colour.

| Municipality | Population | Previous control | New control |
|---|---|---|---|
| Almendralejo | 33,468 | People's Party (PP) | Spanish Socialist Workers' Party (PSOE) |
| **Badajoz** | 150,530 | People's Party (PP) | People's Party (PP) |
| **Cáceres** | 96,068 | People's Party (PP) | Spanish Socialist Workers' Party (PSOE) |
| Mérida | 59,352 | Spanish Socialist Workers' Party (PSOE) | Spanish Socialist Workers' Party (PSOE) |
| Plasencia | 40,141 | People's Party (PP) | People's Party (PP) |

== Municipalities ==
=== Almendralejo ===
Population: 33,468

← Summary of the 26 May 2019 City Council of Almendralejo election results →
| Parties and alliances | Popular vote | | | Seats | |
| Parties and alliances | Votes | % | ±pp | Total | +/− |
|---|---|---|---|---|---|
| Spanish Socialist Workers' Party (PSOE) | 6,825 | 42.92 | +12.84 | **10** | +2 |
| People's Party (PP) | 4,529 | 28.48 | −21.32 | **7** | −6 |
| Citizens–Party of the Citizenry (Cs) | 2,039 | 12.82 | +8.36 | **3** | +3 |
| Vox (Vox) | 825 | 5.19 | New | **1** | +1 |
| Citizens' Initiative for Almendralejo (ICALM) | 771 | 4.85 | New | 0 | ±0 |
| We Can (Podemos) | 479 | 3.01 | New | 0 | ±0 |
| United Left (IU) | 256 | 1.61 | −3.18 | 0 | ±0 |
| Public Defense Organization (ODP) | 31 | 0.19 | New | 0 | ±0 |
| For a Fairer World (PUM+J) | 23 | 0.14 | New | 0 | ±0 |
| Blank ballots | 124 | 0.78 | −1.20 | | |
| **Total** | **15,902** | | | **21** | **±0** |
| Valid votes | 15,902 | 99.05 | +0.85 | | |
| Invalid votes | 153 | 0.95 | −0.85 | | |
| **Votes cast / turnout** | **16,055** | **64.87** | **−1.93** | | |
| Abstentions | 8,693 | 35.13 | +1.93 | | |
| **Registered voters** | **24,748** | | | | |

=== Badajoz ===
Population: 150,530

← Summary of the 26 May 2019 City Council of Badajoz election results →
| Parties and alliances | Popular vote | | | Seats | |
| Parties and alliances | Votes | % | ±pp | Total | +/− |
|---|---|---|---|---|---|
| Spanish Socialist Workers' Party (PSOE) | 25,727 | 37.50 | +7.23 | **12** | +3 |
| People's Party (PP) | 21,217 | 30.93 | −8.62 | **9** | −4 |
| Citizens–Party of the Citizenry (Cs) | 9,024 | 13.15 | +6.08 | **4** | +2 |
| United for Badajoz (Podemos–IU–Equo)^{1} | 3,927 | 5.72 | −7.54 | **1** | −2 |
| Vox (Vox) | 3,789 | 5.52 | +4.98 | **1** | +1 |
| Forward Badajoz (BA) | 3,326 | 4.85 | +1.90 | 0 | ±0 |
| Together for Badajoz (JXB) | 713 | 1.04 | New | 0 | ±0 |
| Extremadurans (eXtremeños) | 243 | 0.35 | −0.38 | 0 | ±0 |
| For a Fairer World (PUM+J) | 120 | 0.17 | New | 0 | ±0 |
| Blank ballots | 520 | 0.76 | −1.01 | | |
| **Total** | **68,606** | | | **27** | **±0** |
| Valid votes | 68,606 | 99.29 | +0.68 | | |
| Invalid votes | 490 | 0.71 | −0.68 | | |
| **Votes cast / turnout** | **69,096** | **58.46** | **−2.88** | | |
| Abstentions | 49,098 | 41.54 | +2.88 | | |
| **Registered voters** | **118,194** | | | | |
Sources
Footnotes: ^{1} United for Badajoz results are compared to the combined totals of Recover Badajoz and Let's Win–United Left–The Greens in the 2015 election.

=== Cáceres ===
Population: 96,068

← Summary of the 26 May 2019 City Council of Cáceres election results →
| Parties and alliances | Popular vote | | | Seats | |
| Parties and alliances | Votes | % | ±pp | Total | +/− |
|---|---|---|---|---|---|
| Spanish Socialist Workers' Party (PSOE) | 17,032 | 34.46 | +6.84 | **9** | +1 |
| People's Party (PP) | 13,417 | 27.15 | −7.32 | **7** | −4 |
| Citizens–Party of the Citizenry (Cs) | 9,507 | 19.24 | +5.31 | **5** | +1 |
| United for Cáceres (Podemos–IU–Equo)^{1} | 5,220 | 10.56 | −2.02 | **3** | +1 |
| Vox (Vox) | 3,228 | 6.53 | New | **1** | +1 |
| United Extremadura (EU) | 557 | 1.13 | −0.49 | 0 | ±0 |
| Blank ballots | 463 | 0.94 | −0.99 | | |
| **Total** | **49,424** | | | **25** | **±0** |
| Valid votes | 49,424 | 99.00 | +1.15 | | |
| Invalid votes | 498 | 1.00 | −1.15 | | |
| **Votes cast / turnout** | **49,922** | **64.84** | **−2.96** | | |
| Abstentions | 27,071 | 35.16 | +2.96 | | |
| **Registered voters** | **76,993** | | | | |
Sources
Footnotes: ^{1} United for Cáceres results are compared to the combined totals of You Are Cáceres and Let's Win–United Left–The Greens in the 2015 election.

=== Mérida ===
Population: 59,352

← Summary of the 26 May 2019 City Council of Mérida election results →
| Parties and alliances | Popular vote | | | Seats | |
| Parties and alliances | Votes | % | ±pp | Total | +/− |
|---|---|---|---|---|---|
| Spanish Socialist Workers' Party (PSOE) | 13,703 | 48.87 | +6.74 | **13** | +2 |
| People's Party (PP) | 5,351 | 19.08 | −9.24 | **5** | −3 |
| Citizens–Party of the Citizenry (Cs) | 3,831 | 13.66 | +6.00 | **3** | +1 |
| United for Mérida (IU–Podemos–Equo)^{1} | 2,623 | 9.35 | −4.96 | **2** | −2 |
| Vox (Vox) | 1,973 | 7.04 | New | **2** | +2 |
| Act (PACT) | 136 | 0.48 | New | 0 | ±0 |
| Public Defense Organization (ODP) | 123 | 0.44 | New | 0 | ±0 |
| Blank ballots | 302 | 1.08 | −1.40 | | |
| **Total** | **28,042** | | | **25** | **±0** |
| Valid votes | 28,042 | 99.21 | +1.08 | | |
| Invalid votes | 224 | 0.79 | −1.08 | | |
| **Votes cast / turnout** | **28,266** | **60.64** | **−5.46** | | |
| Abstentions | 18,343 | 39.36 | +5.46 | | |
| **Registered voters** | **46,609** | | | | |
Sources
Footnotes: ^{1} United for Mérida results are compared to the combined totals of Mérida Participates and Let's Win–United Left–The Greens in the 2015 election.

=== Plasencia ===
Population: 40,141

← Summary of the 26 May 2019 City Council of Plasencia election results →
| Parties and alliances | Popular vote | | | Seats | |
| Parties and alliances | Votes | % | ±pp | Total | +/− |
|---|---|---|---|---|---|
| People's Party (PP) | 10,292 | 50.47 | +8.34 | **12** | +1 |
| Spanish Socialist Workers' Party (PSOE)^{1} | 5,242 | 25.71 | −0.91 | **6** | −1 |
| United for Plasencia (Podemos–IU)^{2} | 1,743 | 8.55 | +3.85 | **2** | +2 |
| Citizens–Party of the Citizenry (Cs) | 1,129 | 5.54 | −1.37 | **1** | ±0 |
| Union of Independent Citizens (UCIN) | 690 | 3.38 | New | 0 | ±0 |
| Plasencia in Common (PeC) | 653 | 3.20 | −3.33 | 0 | −1 |
| Vox (Vox) | 456 | 2.24 | +1.72 | 0 | ±0 |
| Extremadurans (eXtremeños) | n/a | n/a | −5.26 | 0 | −1 |
| Blank ballots | 187 | 0.92 | −1.25 | | |
| **Total** | **20,392** | | | **21** | **±0** |
| Valid votes | 20,392 | 99.10 | +1.72 | | |
| Invalid votes | 185 | 0.90 | −1.72 | | |
| **Votes cast / turnout** | **20,577** | **62.30** | **−2.05** | | |
| Abstentions | 12,451 | 37.70 | +2.05 | | |
| **Registered voters** | **33,028** | | | | |
Sources
Footnotes: ^{1} Spanish Socialist Workers' Party results are compared to the combined totals of Spanish Socialist Workers' Party and Independent Socialists of Extremadura in the 2015 election.; ^{2} United for Plasencia results are compared to the Let's Win–United Left–The Greens Plasencia totals in the 2015 election.

== See also ==
- 2019 Extremaduran regional election
