= 2027 Spanish local elections =

- 23 May 2027

All councillors in 8,132 municipal councils (Note: Including 50 seats in the assemblies of Ceuta and Melilla.) All 1,424 provincial/island seats in 44 provinces (Note: Including: 1,038 seats in 38 provincial deputations; 157 seats in 7 Canarian island cabildos; 153 seats in 3 Basque foral deputations; 76 seats in 4 Balearic island councils.)
- Opinion polls
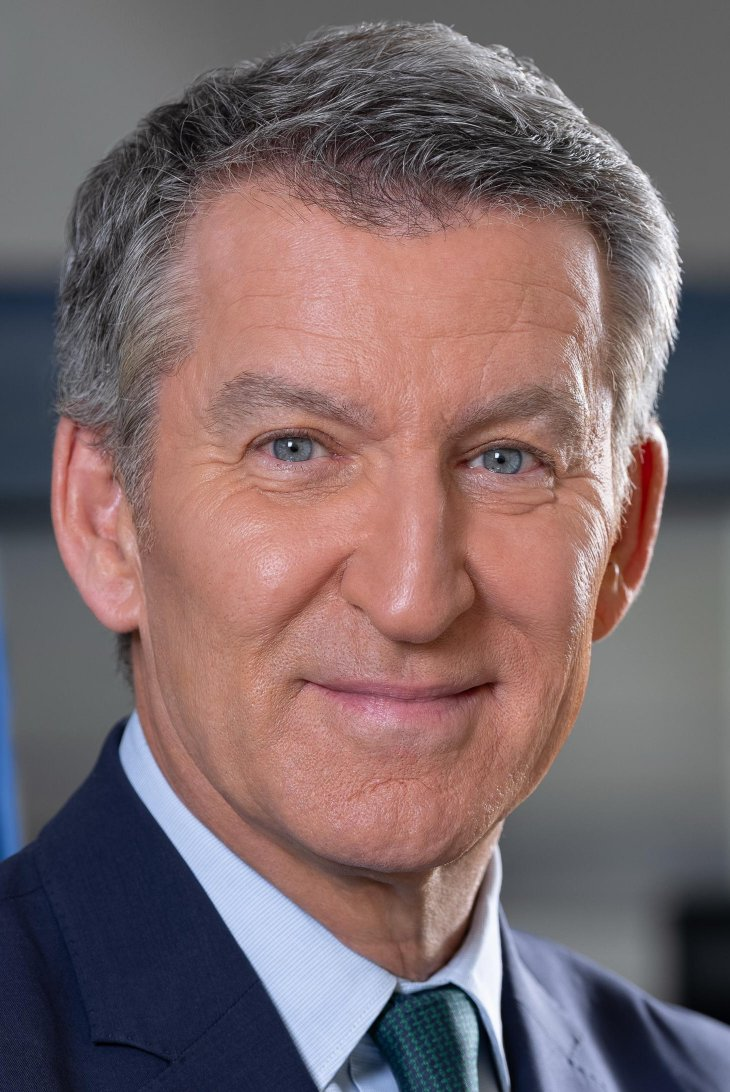

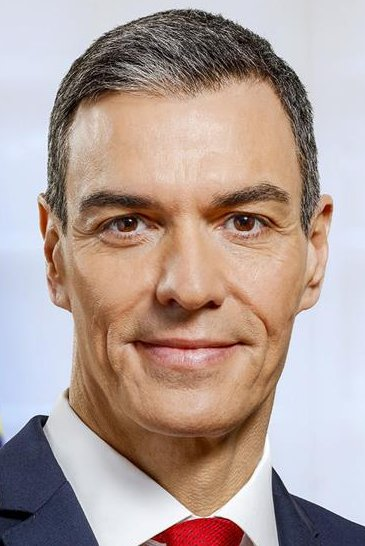

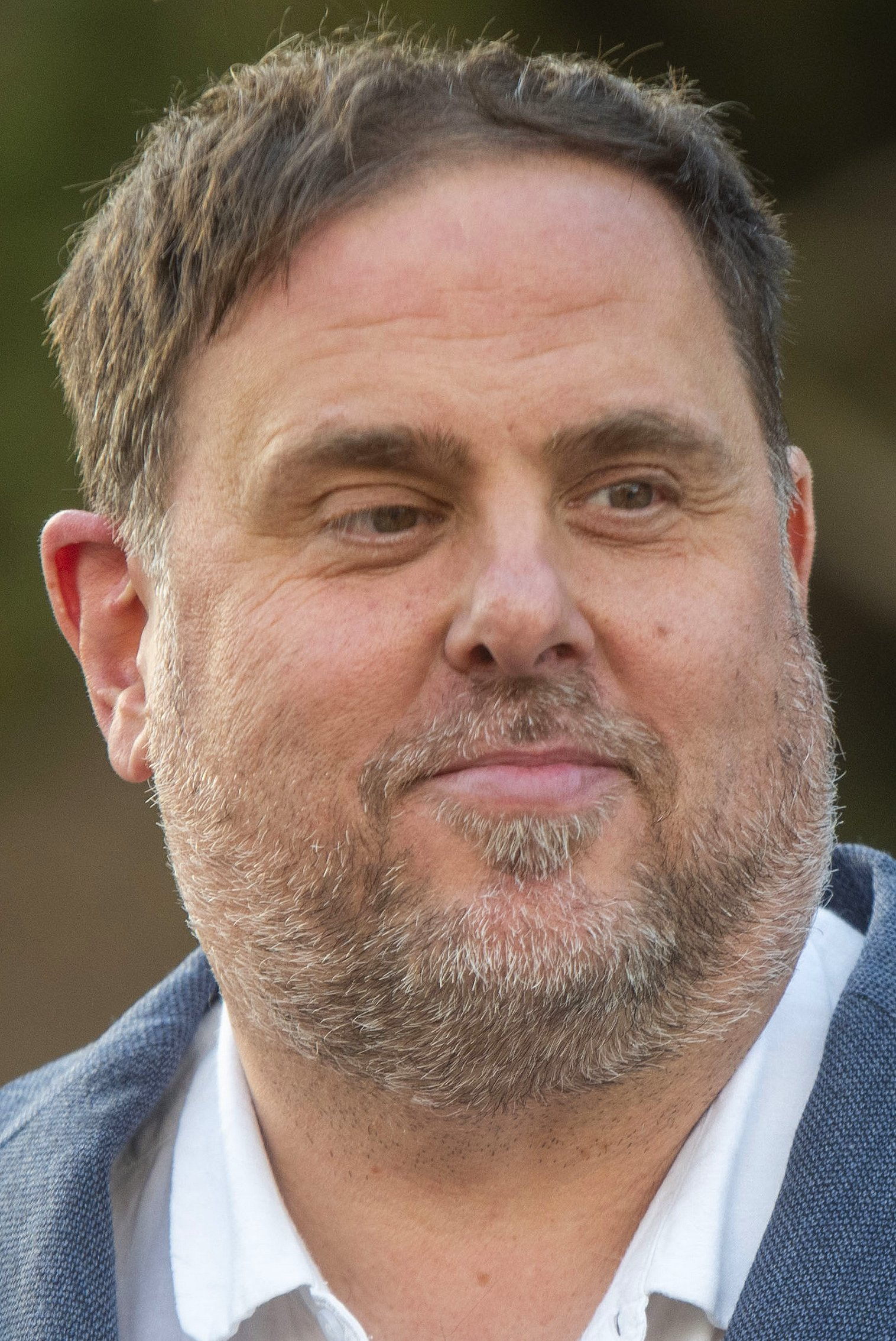

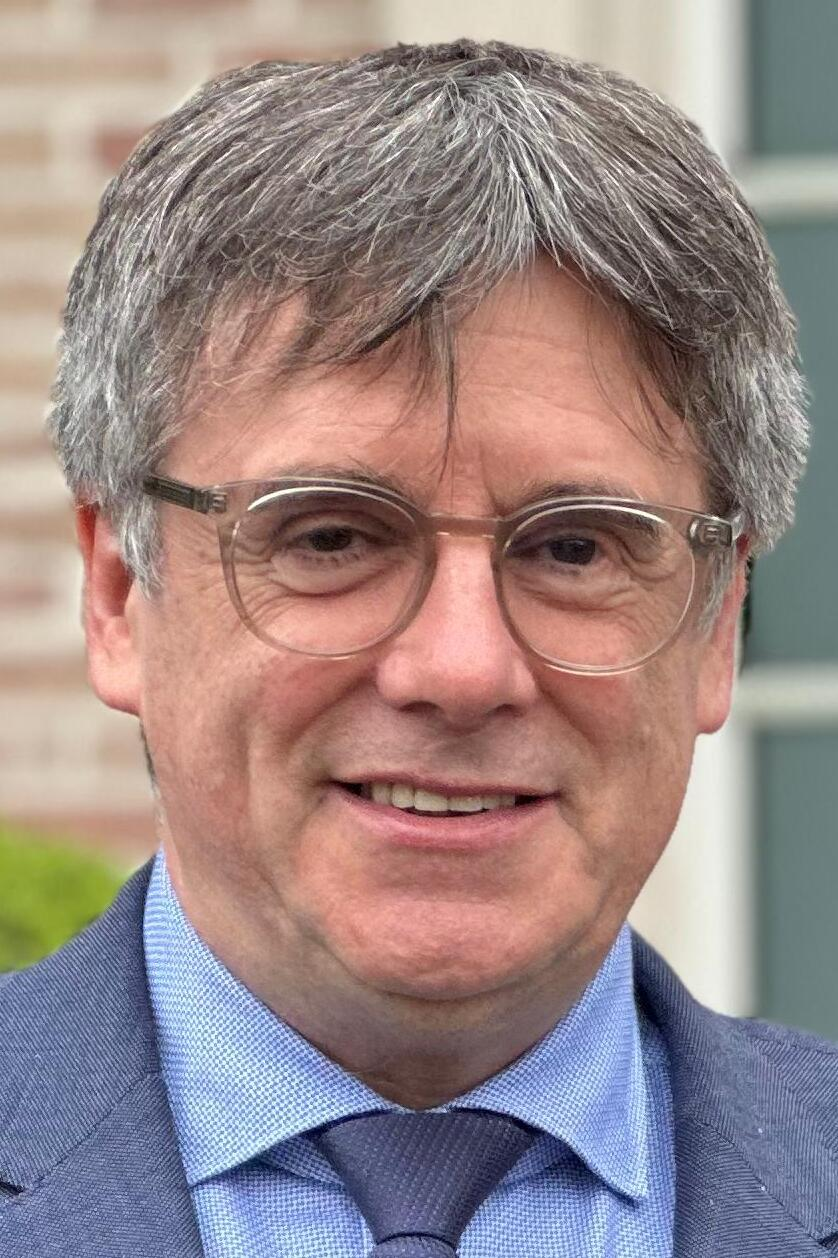

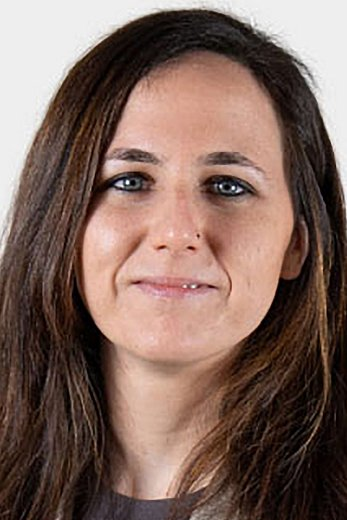

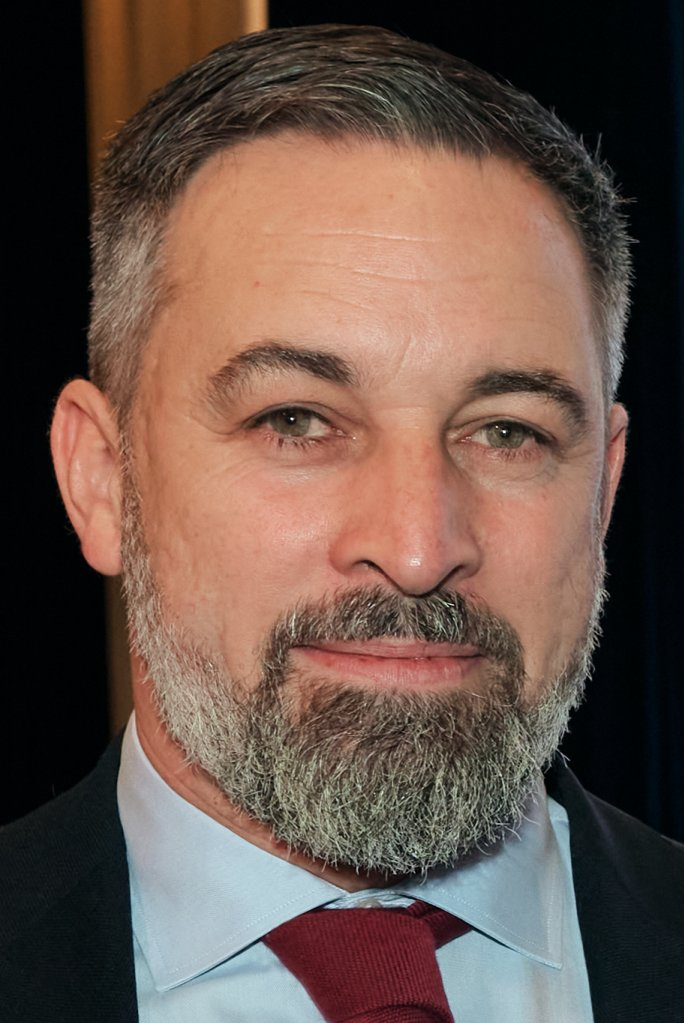
Leader	Alberto Núñez Feijóo	Pedro Sánchez	Oriol Junqueras
Party	PP	PSOE	ERC–AM
Leader since	2 April 2022	18 June 2017	14 December 2024
Last election	23,442 c., 31.6% 520 p.	20,790 c., 28.1% 491 p.	2,906 c., 2.4% 36 p.
Leader	Carles Puigdemont	Ione Belarra	Santiago Abascal
Party	JxCat–CM	Unidas Podemos	Vox
Leader since	27 October 2024	13 June 2021	20 September 2014
Last election	2,687 c., 2.5% 40 p.	1,943 c., 6.3% 31 p.	1,671 c., 7.2% 49 p.

Local elections will be held in Spain on 23 May 2027 to elect all councillors in the 8,132 Spanish municipalities (including 50 seats in the assemblies of the autonomous cities of Ceuta and Melilla), all 1,191 provincial seats in 41 provinces (including 38 indirectly-elected provincial deputations and the three foral deputations in the Basque Country) and 233 seats in ten island councils (seven Canarian and four Balearic ones). They will be held concurrently with regional elections in at least seven autonomous communities.

== Overview ==
=== Local government ===
Under the 1978 Constitution, the governance of municipalities in Spain is centered on the figure of city councils (Spanish: ayuntamientos), local corporations with independent legal personality composed of a mayor, a government council and an elected legislative assembly. The mayor is indirectly elected by the local assembly, requiring an absolute majority; otherwise, the candidate from the most-voted party automatically becomes mayor (ties are resolved by drawing lots). The concejo abierto system (English: open council), under which voters directly elect the local mayor by plurality voting, is reserved for some minor local entities.

Provincial deputations are the governing bodies of provinces in Spain—except for single-province autonomous communities—having an administration role of municipal activities and composed of a provincial president, an administrative body, and a plenary. For insular provinces, such as the Balearic and Canary Islands, deputations are replaced by island councils in each of the islands or group of islands. For Gran Canaria, Tenerife, Fuerteventura, La Gomera, El Hierro, Lanzarote and La Palma, this figure is referred to in Spanish as cabildo insular, whereas for Mallorca, Menorca, Ibiza and Formentera, its name is consejo insular (Catalan: consell insular). The three Basque provinces had foral deputations instead (called General Assemblies, or Juntas Generales).

=== Date ===
The term of local assemblies in Spain expires four years after the date of their previous election, with election day being fixed for the fourth Sunday of May every four years (as of 2026, this has been the year before a leap year). The election decree shall be issued no later than 54 days before the scheduled election date and published on the following day in the Official State Gazette (BOE). The previous local elections were held on 28 May 2023, setting the date for election day on the fourth Sunday of May four years later, which is 23 May 2027.

Local assemblies can not be dissolved before the expiration of their term, except in cases of mismanagement that seriously harm the public interest and imply a breach of constitutional obligations, in which case the Council of Ministers can—optionally—decide to call a by-election.

=== Electoral system ===
Voting for local assemblies and island councils is based on universal suffrage, comprising all Spanish nationals over 18 years of age, registered and residing in the municipality or council and with full political rights (provided that they have not been deprived of the right to vote by a final sentence), as well as resident non-national European citizens, and those whose country of origin allows reciprocal voting by virtue of a treaty.

Local councillors are elected using the D'Hondt method and closed-list proportional voting, with a five percent-threshold of valid votes (including blank ballots) in each constituency. Each municipality or council is a multi-member constituency, with a number of seats based on the following scale:

Population	Councillors		
Population	Municipalities	Canary Islands	Balearic Islands (Note: For the Island Council of Formentera, councillors in the city council serve as island councillors.)
<100	3	No island below 5,000 inhabitants	Fixed number: Ibiza: 13; Menorca: 13; Mallorca: 33; Formentera: Same as homonymous city council
101–250	5	No island below 5,000 inhabitants	Fixed number: Ibiza: 13; Menorca: 13; Mallorca: 33; Formentera: Same as homonymous city council
251–1,000	7	No island below 5,000 inhabitants	Fixed number: Ibiza: 13; Menorca: 13; Mallorca: 33; Formentera: Same as homonymous city council
1,001–2,000	9	No island below 5,000 inhabitants	Fixed number: Ibiza: 13; Menorca: 13; Mallorca: 33; Formentera: Same as homonymous city council
2,001–5,000	11	No island below 5,000 inhabitants	Fixed number: Ibiza: 13; Menorca: 13; Mallorca: 33; Formentera: Same as homonymous city council
5,001–10,000	13	11	Fixed number: Ibiza: 13; Menorca: 13; Mallorca: 33; Formentera: Same as homonymous city council
10,001–20,000	17	13	Fixed number: Ibiza: 13; Menorca: 13; Mallorca: 33; Formentera: Same as homonymous city council
20,001–50,000	21	17	Fixed number: Ibiza: 13; Menorca: 13; Mallorca: 33; Formentera: Same as homonymous city council
50,001–100,000	25	21	Fixed number: Ibiza: 13; Menorca: 13; Mallorca: 33; Formentera: Same as homonymous city council
>100,001	+1 per each 100,000 inhabitants or fraction +1 if total is an even number		Fixed number: Ibiza: 13; Menorca: 13; Mallorca: 33; Formentera: Same as homonymous city council

Councillors in municipalities below 250 inhabitants are elected using open-list partial block voting, with voters in constituencies between 101 and 250 inhabitants choosing up to four candidates; and in those below 100, up to two.

Most provincial deputations are indirectly elected by applying the D'Hondt method and a three percent-threshold of valid votes to municipal results—excluding candidacies not electing any councillor—in each judicial district. Seats are allocated to provincial deputations based on the following scale (with each judicial district being assigned an initial minimum of one seat and a maximum of three-fifths of the total number of provincial seats, with the remaining ones distributed in proportion to population):

Population	Seats
<500,000	25
500,001–1,000,000	27
1,000,001–3,500,000	31
>3,500,001	51

The General Assemblies of Álava, Biscay and Gipuzkoa are directly elected by voters under their own, specific electoral regulations.

The law does not provide for by-elections to fill vacant seats; instead, any vacancies arising after the proclamation of candidates and during the legislative term are filled by the next candidates on the party lists or, when required, by designated substitutes.

== Parties and candidates ==
The electoral law allows for parties and federations registered in the interior ministry, coalitions and groupings of electors to present lists of candidates. Parties and federations intending to form an alliance are required to inform the relevant electoral commission within 10 days of the election call, whereas groupings of electors need to secure the signature of a determined amount of the electors registered in the municipality for which they seek election, disallowing electors from signing for more than one list:

- At least one percent of the electors in municipalities with a population below 5,000 inhabitants, provided that the number of signers is more than double that of councillors at stake.
- At least 100 signatures in municipalities with a population between 5,001 and 10,000.
- At least 500 signatures in municipalities with a population between 10,001 and 50,000.
- At least 1,500 signatures in municipalities with a population between 50,001 and 150,000.
- At least 3,000 signatures in municipalities with a population between 150,001 and 300,000.
- At least 5,000 signatures in municipalities with a population between 300,001 and 1,000,000.
- At least 8,000 signatures in municipalities with a population over 1,000,001.

Amendments in 2024 required a balanced composition of men and women in the electoral lists through the use of a zipper system.

== Present situation ==
=== Municipal ===
==== Current control ====
The following table lists party control in provincial capitals, as well as in municipalities with a population above or around 75,000.

Municipality	Population	Previous control
A Coruña		Spanish Socialist Workers' Party (PSOE)
Albacete		People's Party (PP)
Alcalá de Guadaíra		Spanish Socialist Workers' Party (PSOE)
Alcalá de Henares		People's Party (PP)
Alcobendas		People's Party (PP)
Alcorcón		Spanish Socialist Workers' Party (PSOE)
Algeciras		People's Party (PP)
Alicante		People's Party (PP)
Almería		People's Party (PP)
Arona		People's Party (PP)
Ávila		For Ávila (XAV)
Avilés		Spanish Socialist Workers' Party (PSOE)
Badajoz		People's Party (PP)
Badalona		People's Party (PP)
Barakaldo		Basque Nationalist Party (EAJ/PNV)
Barcelona		Socialists' Party of Catalonia (PSC–PSOE)
Bilbao		Basque Nationalist Party (EAJ/PNV)
Burgos		People's Party (PP)
Cáceres		People's Party (PP)
Cádiz		People's Party (PP)
Cartagena		People's Party (PP)
Castellón de la Plana		People's Party (PP)
Ceuta		People's Party (PP)
Chiclana de la Frontera		Spanish Socialist Workers' Party (PSOE)
Ciudad Real		People's Party (PP)
Córdoba		People's Party (PP)
Cornellà de Llobregat		Socialists' Party of Catalonia (PSC–PSOE)
Coslada		Spanish Socialist Workers' Party (PSOE)
Cuenca		Spanish Socialist Workers' Party (PSOE)
Donostia/San Sebastián		Basque Nationalist Party (EAJ/PNV)
Dos Hermanas		Spanish Socialist Workers' Party (PSOE)
El Ejido		People's Party (PP)
El Puerto de Santa María		People's Party (PP)
Elche		People's Party (PP)
Ferrol	(Note: Reached 75,000 in 1970–2007.)	People's Party (PP)
Fuengirola		People's Party (PP)
Fuenlabrada		Spanish Socialist Workers' Party (PSOE)
Gandía		Spanish Socialist Workers' Party (PSOE)
Getafe		Spanish Socialist Workers' Party (PSOE)
Getxo		Basque Nationalist Party (EAJ/PNV)
Gijón		Asturias Forum (Foro)
Girona		Popular Unity Candidacy (CUP)
Granada		People's Party (PP)
Guadalajara		People's Party (PP)
Huelva		People's Party (PP)
Huesca		People's Party (PP)
Jaén		Spanish Socialist Workers' Party (PSOE)
Jerez de la Frontera		People's Party (PP)
L'Hospitalet de Llobregat		Socialists' Party of Catalonia (PSC–PSOE)
Las Palmas de Gran Canaria		Spanish Socialist Workers' Party (PSOE)
Las Rozas de Madrid		People's Party (PP)
Leganés		People's Party (PP)
León		Spanish Socialist Workers' Party (PSOE)
Lleida		Socialists' Party of Catalonia (PSC–PSOE)
Logroño		People's Party (PP)
Lorca		People's Party (PP)
Lugo		People's Party (PP)
Madrid		People's Party (PP)
Málaga		People's Party (PP)
Manresa		Republican Left of Catalonia (ERC)
Marbella		People's Party (PP)
Mataró		Socialists' Party of Catalonia (PSC–PSOE)
Melilla		People's Party (PP)
Mijas		People's Party (PP)
Móstoles		People's Party (PP)
Murcia		People's Party (PP)
Orihuela		People's Party (PP)
Ourense		Ourensan Democracy (DO)
Oviedo		People's Party (PP)
Palencia		Spanish Socialist Workers' Party (PSOE)
Palma de Mallorca		People's Party (PP)
Pamplona		Basque Country Gather (EH Bildu)
Parla		Spanish Socialist Workers' Party (PSOE)
Pontevedra		Galician Nationalist Bloc (BNG)
Pozuelo de Alarcón		People's Party (PP)
Reus		Socialists' Party of Catalonia (PSC–PSOE)
Rivas-Vaciamadrid		United Left (IU)
Roquetas de Mar		People's Party (PP)
Rubí		Socialists' Party of Catalonia (PSC–PSOE)
Sabadell		Socialists' Party of Catalonia (PSC–PSOE)
Salamanca		People's Party (PP)
San Cristóbal de La Laguna		Spanish Socialist Workers' Party (PSOE)
San Fernando		Spanish Socialist Workers' Party (PSOE)
San Sebastián de los Reyes		People's Party (PP)
Sant Boi de Llobregat		Socialists' Party of Catalonia (PSC–PSOE)
Sant Cugat del Vallès		Together for Catalonia (JxCat)
Santa Coloma de Gramenet		Socialists' Party of Catalonia (PSC–PSOE)
Santa Cruz de Tenerife		Canarian Coalition (CCa)
Santander		People's Party (PP)
Santiago de Compostela		Galician Nationalist Bloc (BNG)
Segovia		People's Party (PP)
Seville		People's Party (PP)
Soria		Spanish Socialist Workers' Party (PSOE)
Talavera de la Reina		People's Party (PP)
Tarragona		Socialists' Party of Catalonia (PSC–PSOE)
Telde		Citizens for Canarian Change (CIUCA)
Terrassa		All for Terrassa (TxT)
Teruel		People's Party (PP)
Toledo		People's Party (PP)
Torrejón de Ardoz		People's Party (PP)
Torrent		People's Party (PP)
Torrevieja		People's Party (PP)
Valencia		People's Party (PP)
Valladolid		People's Party (PP)
Vélez-Málaga		People's Party (PP)
Vigo		Spanish Socialist Workers' Party (PSOE)
Vitoria-Gasteiz		Spanish Socialist Workers' Party (PSOE)
Zamora		United Left (IU)
Zaragoza		People's Party (PP)

==== Autonomous cities ====
The following table lists party control in the autonomous cities. Gains for a party are highlighted in that party's colour.

City	Population	Current control
Ceuta	84,222	People's Party (PP)
Melilla	86,971	People's Party (PP)

=== Provincial and island ===
==== Indirectly-elected ====
The following table lists party control in the indirectly-elected provincial deputations.

Province	Population	Current control
A Coruña	1,143,461	Spanish Socialist Workers' Party (PSOE)
Albacete	393,285	Spanish Socialist Workers' Party (PSOE)
Alicante	2,075,553	People's Party (PP)
Almería	782,020	People's Party (PP)
Ávila	162,092	People's Party (PP)
Badajoz	666,493	Spanish Socialist Workers' Party (PSOE)
Barcelona	6,016,426	Socialists' Party of Catalonia (PSC–PSOE)
Burgos	366,562	People's Party (PP)
Cáceres	388,704	Spanish Socialist Workers' Party (PSOE)
Cádiz	1,266,061	People's Party (PP)
Castellón	640,598	People's Party (PP)
Ciudad Real	498,197	People's Party (PP)
Córdoba	770,508	People's Party (PP)
Cuenca	200,828	Spanish Socialist Workers' Party (PSOE)
Girona	837,917	Together for Catalonia (JxCat)
Granada	954,560	People's Party (PP)
Guadalajara	291,648	Spanish Socialist Workers' Party (PSOE)
Huelva	541,814	People's Party (PP)
Huesca	232,853	People's Party (PP)
Jaén	618,866	Spanish Socialist Workers' Party (PSOE)
León	449,185	Spanish Socialist Workers' Party (PSOE)
Lleida	464,656	Republican Left of Catalonia (ERC)
Lugo	327,819	Spanish Socialist Workers' Party (PSOE)
Málaga	1,805,105	People's Party (PP)
Ourense	306,621	People's Party (PP)
Palencia	160,053	People's Party (PP)
Pontevedra	950,414	People's Party (PP)
Salamanca	330,200	People's Party (PP)
Segovia	160,277	People's Party (PP)
Seville	1,994,601	Spanish Socialist Workers' Party (PSOE)
Soria	90,907	People's Party (PP)
Tarragona	889,895	Republican Left of Catalonia (ERC)
Teruel	137,189	People's Party (PP)
Toledo	770,286	People's Party (PP)
Valencia	2,805,449	People's Party (PP)
Valladolid	533,705	People's Party (PP)
Zamora	165,444	People's Party (PP)
Zaragoza	1,011,800	Spanish Socialist Workers' Party (PSOE)

==== Island councils ====
The following table lists party control in the island councils.

Island	Population	Current control
El Hierro	12,133	Spanish Socialist Workers' Party (PSOE)
Formentera	11,943	Sa Unió de Formentera (Sa Unió)
Fuerteventura	130,977	Canarian Coalition (CCa)
Gran Canaria	879,456	New Canaries (NCa)
Ibiza	166,020	People's Party (PP)
La Gomera	22,208	Gomera Socialist Group (ASG)
La Palma	86,984	Canarian Coalition (CCa)
Lanzarote	168,958	Canarian Coalition (CCa)
Mallorca	978,465	People's Party (PP)
Menorca	103,117	People's Party (PP)
Tenerife	972,018	Canarian Coalition (CCa)

==== Foral deputations ====
The following table lists party control in the foral deputations.

Province	Population	Current control
Álava	344,665	Basque Nationalist Party (EAJ/PNV)
Biscay	1,172,830	Basque Nationalist Party (EAJ/PNV)
Gipuzkoa	735,235	Basque Nationalist Party (EAJ/PNV)

== Bibliography ==
- Constitución Española (Constitution). Official State Gazette (in Spanish). 27 December 1978 [version as of 20 May 2026]. BOE-A-1978-31229.
- Ley 27/1983, de 25 de noviembre, de Relaciones entre las Instituciones Comunes de la Comunidad Autónoma y los Órganos Forales de sus Territorios Históricos (Law 27/1983). Official State Gazette (in Spanish). 25 November 1983 [version as of 31 December 2021]. BOE-A-2012-5193.
- Ley 7/1985, de 2 de abril, Reguladora de las Bases del Régimen Local (Law 7/1985). Official State Gazette (in Spanish). 2 April 1985 [version as of 3 January 2025]. BOE-A-1985-5392.
- Ley Orgánica 5/1985, de 19 de junio, del Régimen Electoral General (Organic Law 5/1985). Official State Gazette (in Spanish). 19 June 1985 [version as of 14 July 2025]. BOE-A-1985-11672.
- Ley 8/1986, de 26 de noviembre, Electoral de la Comunidad Autónoma de las Islas Baleares (Law 8/1986). Official State Gazette (in Spanish). 26 November 1986 [version as of 2 February 2019]. BOE-A-1987-2903.
- Ley 1/1987, de 27 de marzo, de Elecciones para las Juntas Generales de los Territorios Históricos de Araba, Bizkaia y Gipuzkoa (Law 1/1987). Official State Gazette (in Spanish). 27 March 1987 [version as of 2 March 2005]. BOE-A-2012-3948.
- Ley 8/2000, de 27 de octubre, de Consejos Insulares (Law 8/2000). Official State Gazette (in Spanish). 27 October 2000 [version as of 7 July 2022]. BOE-A-2000-20977.
- Ley Orgánica 1/2007, de 28 de febrero, de reforma del Estatuto de Autonomía de las Illes Balears (Organic Law 1/2007). Official State Gazette (in Spanish). 28 February 2007 [version as of 28 December 2022]. BOE-A-2007-4233.
- Ley 7/2009, de 11 de diciembre, electoral de los Consejos Insulares (Law 7/2009). Official State Gazette (in Spanish). 11 December 2009 [version as of 22 December 2009]. BOE-A-2010-1399.
- Ley 8/2015, de 1 de abril, de Cabildos Insulares (Law 8/2015). Official State Gazette (in Spanish). 1 April 2015 [version as of 30 December 2024]. BOE-A-2015-4621.
- Ley Orgánica 1/2018, de 5 de noviembre, de reforma del Estatuto de Autonomía de Canarias (Organic Law 1/2018). Official State Gazette (in Spanish). 5 November 2018 [version as of 28 December 2022]. BOE-A-2018-15138.
