= IMDEA Software Institute =

Scientific software research institute

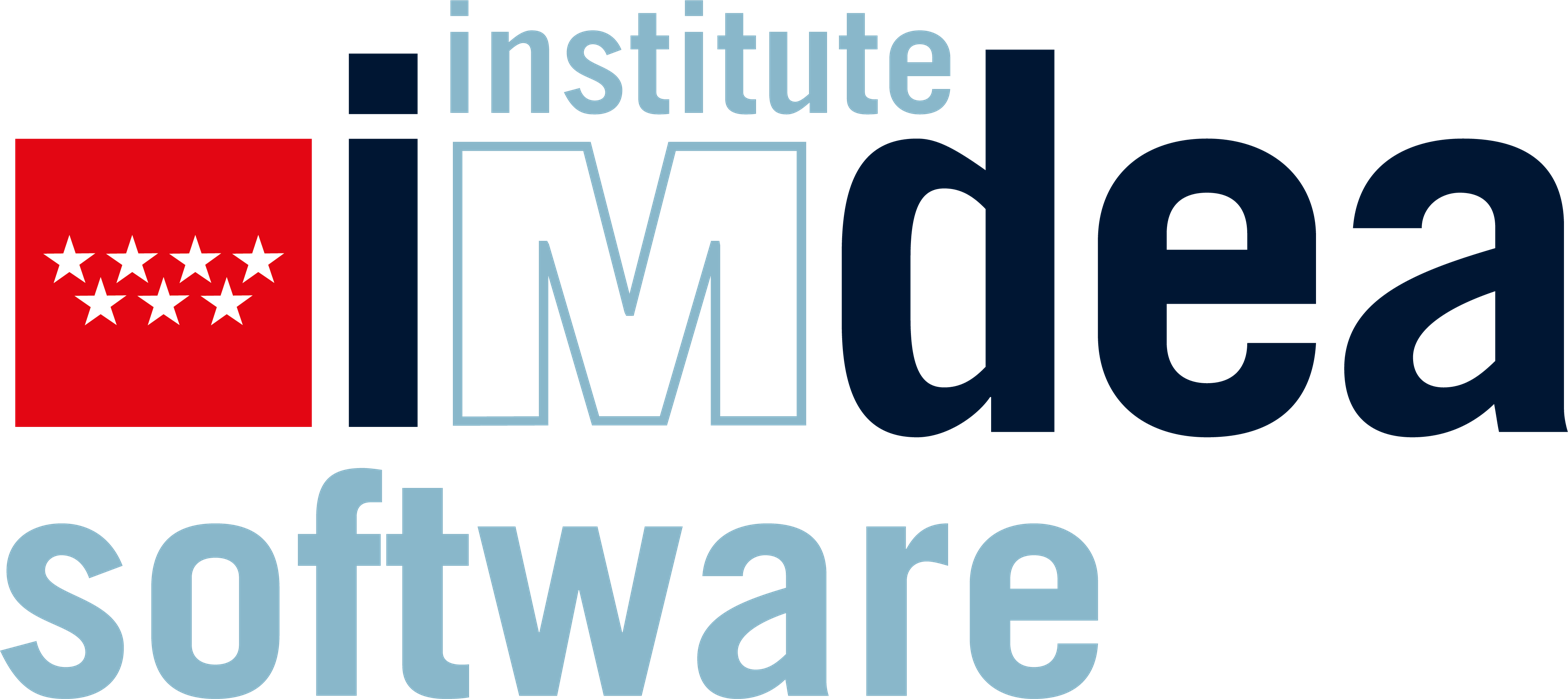
- Logo of the IMDEA Software Institute
- Other name: Madrid Institute for Advanced Studies in Software Development Technologies
- Parent institution: IMDEA
- Established: 2006
- Focus: Software development technologies
- Key people: Manuel Carro (Director), Antonio Fernández Anta (Deputy Director), María Alcaraz (General Manager), Roberto di Cosmo (President of the Board of Trustees)
- Address: Campus Montegancedo, 28223 Pozuelo de Alarcón (Madrid), Spain
- Location: Montegancedo Science and Technology Park at the Technical University of Madrid (UPM), Pozuelo de Alarcón, Spain
- Coordinates: 40°24′25.080″N 3°50′8.717″W
- Interactive map of IMDEA Software Institute
- Website: software.imdea.org

The IMDEA Software Institute (Madrid Institute for Advanced Studies in Software Development Technologies) is a research institute dedicated to advancing the scientific and technological foundations of software development. It focuses on producing the science and technology necessary to ensure that software systems are safe, reliable, and efficient. It was established in 2006 by the Madrid Regional Government, as part of the Madrid Institutes for Advanced Studies (IMDEA) initiative and is located at the Montegancedo Campus of the Polytechnic University of Madrid.

== History ==
The institute was established as one of the seven IMDEA institutes by the Madrid Regional Government in 2006 to enhance scientific research and technological innovation in the region. It is legally constituted as an independent, non-profit foundation.

In 2025, the IMDEA Software Institute received the María de Maeztu accreditation, recognizing it as a Unit of Excellence in Research.

== Research ==
The IMDEA Software Institute focuses on advancing the science and technology needed to develop high-quality, reliable, secure, and efficient software. Its research is primarily concentrated on three areas:

- Logic and Verification: This area develops frameworks and tools to ensure software correctness in functionality, efficiency, and resource use, crucial for fields like avionics and financial technologies. Research includes verification of concurrent systems and static analysis techniques.
- Programming Languages and Software Engineering: This research provides tools for creating clear and modular code, focusing on programming languages that express complex properties and techniques to simplify programming. It includes work on type systems, compilation, and AI applications to improve system performance.
- Security and Cryptography: This area aims to secure computations and data storage in hostile environments, focusing on cryptography, network security, malware analysis, and privacy-enhancing technologies.

=== European Research Council (ERC) grants ===
The IMDEA Software Institute has secured several ERC grants:

Project	Duration	Funding	Objective
PRIMULA	TBD	€2 million	Address microarchitectural attacks by developing hardware–software systems with precise security guarantees tied directly to CPU microarchitecture. Led by Marco Guarnieri.
CRETE	2021–2026	€1.5 million	Enhance software correctness and security using refinement types. Led by Niki Vazou.
PICOCRYPT	2021–2026	€2 million	Develop cryptographic protocols to ensure privacy and integrity in cloud computing environments. Led by Dario Fiore.
MATHADOR	2016–2022	€2 million	Establish mathematical foundations for verifying concurrent software systems. Led by Aleks Nanevski.
RACCOON	2016–2021	€1.5 million	Improve the scalability and consistency of distributed cloud databases through formal reasoning techniques. Led by Alexey Gotsman.

=== MadQuantum-CM ===
MadQuantum-CM is one of IMDEA Software's key research project. It focuses on quantum cybersecurity by enhancing secure communications through a scalable quantum key distribution (QKD) network. Led by a consortium including the Technical University of Madrid and IMDEA Software, MadQuantum-CM integrates software-defined networking (SDN) and all-optical switches to dynamically establish quantum links across nine interconnected nodes in the Madrid metropolitan area. This initiative supports a wide range of QKD technologies and protocols, promoting interoperability and the integration of new devices, and setting a blueprint for future quantum communication infrastructures such as the EuroQCI project. The MadQuantum-CM project is part of broader efforts to strengthen Madrid's position in secure quantum communications, with an overall funding of €73 million from the Regional Government of Madrid, the Spanish Government, the European Union, and further supporters.

== Governance ==
The institute operates as an independent foundation governed by a board of trustees, comprising representatives from academia, industry, and government. A scientific advisory board, consisting of international academics, provides guidance on the institute's scientific strategy and research activities. It is composed of Roberto Di Cosmo, Gustavo Alonso, María Alpuente, Anindya Banerjee, Patrick Cousot, Veronica Dahl, José Meseguer, Luís Moniz Pereira, Catuscia Palamidessi, Marta Patiño, Martin Wirsing, and Andreas Zeller.

== Media Coverage ==
The institute's research has garnered substantial media attention. Their contributions to safety research in cryptography were covered by The Economist. Additionally, their development of a tool for tracking cybercrime was covered by several major outlets, including COPE. Their quantum communication network was covered by La Vanguardia. Their research on security threats in smart homes has been covered by El País, ElDiario.es, and 20 Minutos. Additionally, research on the economic aspects of cybercrime, specifically the hidden fortunes and overestimations in cybercrime revenue, was highlighted by Eurasia Review, Europa Press, and Madrimasd. The investigation into the use of disposable phone numbers in online frauds was also featured in an article by ADSLZone. Lastly, the hidden riches of cybercrime were explored in detail by Knowridge Science Report and El Mundo.

== See also ==
- IMDEA
- IMDEA Nanoscience Institute
- IMDEA Networks Institute
