= Association for Logic Programming =

The Association for Logic Programming (ALP) was founded in 1986. Its mission is "to contribute to the development of Logic Programming, relate it to other formal and also to humanistic sciences, and to promote its uses in academia and industry all over the world". It manages the International Conference on Logic Programming, oversees the journal Theory and Practice of Logic Programming (TPLP), and publishes an electronic newsletter.

The activities of the Association are directed by an Executive Committee and President, elected by ALP members. The current president is Enrico Pontelli. Here is a list of all presidents:

- 2024- Enrico Pontelli at New Mexico State University
- 2019-2024 Thomas Eiter (pro term 2019-2020) at Vienna University of Technology
- 2014-2019 Torsten Schaub at the University of Potsdam
- 2010-2014 Gopal Gupta at the University of Texas, Dallas
- 2005-2009 Manuel Hermenegildo at the Technical University of Madrid
- 2001-2004 Veronica Dahl at Simon Fraser University
- 1997-2000 Krzysztof R. Apt at Centrum Wiskunde & Informatica in Amsterdam
- 1993-1996 David Scott Warren at Stony Brook
- 1989-1992 Herve' Gallaire at the European Computer-Industry Research Center in Munich
- 1986-1988 Keith Clark at Imperial College London

In 1997, the ALP bestowed to fifteen recognized researchers in logic programming the title Founders of Logic Programming to recognize them as pioneers in the field.

- Maurice Bruynooghe (Belgium)
- Jacques Cohen (US)
- Alain Colmerauer (France)
- Keith Clark (UK)
- Veronica Dahl (Canada/Argentina)
- Maarten van Emden (Canada)
- Hervé Gallaire (France)
- Robert Kowalski (UK)
- Jack Minker (US)
- Fernando Pereira (US)
- Luís Moniz Pereira (Portugal)
- Ray Reiter (Canada)
- J. Alan Robinson (US)
- Peter Szeredi (Hungary)
- David H. D. Warren (UK)

== The ALP Alain Colmerauer Prize ==
The ALP Alain Colmerauer Prolog Heritage Prize (in short: the Alain Colmerauer Prize) is organized by the ALP. The Prize is given for recent accomplishments and practical advances in Prolog-inspired computing, understood in a broad sense, where foundational, technological, and practical contributions are eligible with proven evidence or potential for the future development of Logic Programming.
