= Treaty of friendship =

Type of international treaty

A treaty of friendship, also known as a friendship treaty, is a common generic name for any treaty establishing close ties between countries. Friendship treaties have been used for agreements about use and development of resources, territorial integrity, access to harbours, trading lanes and fisheries, and promises of cooperation. Whilst not common, there are some treaties agreeing to some forms of military alliance which have use friendship terminology in their titles, as well as some non-aggression pacts. Additionally, friendship treaties have also signalled an independent relationship with emerging states.

== History ==
Ancient Greeks distinguished between three different types of friendships between two polities: Philiai, symmachia, and epimachia. Both symmachia and epimachia were types of alliances, with the former committing States to support each other in battle and the latter requiring parties to assist each other if one suffered an invasion. Philiai, then, made the important distinction of denoting friendship between polities but did not give the treaty partners the status of allies. Romans had a similar word amicitia, which was a state of diplomatic relations which could coexist with an alliance, or exist without it. The Romans employed a practice of establishing peace and friendship with polities on its peripheries, though in practice these relationships were usually built on unequal treaties, requiring the neighbour to support Rome militarily, though not necessarily the reverse.

In most cases, the friendship treaties are not based on equal partnership. This is particularly the case in treaties between aboriginal nations and the colonizers, both in America and in the Pacific, throughout the Colonial era. These treaties, often written primarily in the language of the coloniser, manipulated the terminology of friendship by the larger powers in order to create an environment of trust, primarily for the benefit of themselves. While promising protection in return for these benefits, the treaties are more subtle ways of accessing resources for commercial exploitation of smaller nations.

Since the early 2000s, friendship in international relations has been under closer analysis. Whilst friendship terminology had always been used in discourse and diplomacy, the analysis of friendship in international relations had been dismissed as merely being synonymous with good relations. In 2007, Felix Berenskoetter called for the inclusion of friendship analysis into international relations and since then a modest body of literature around the concept has been formed.

=== Terminology ===
In the Soviet Union, Agreement of Friendship, Cooperation, and Mutual Assistance or Treaty of Friendship, Cooperation and Mutual Assistance (Russian: Договор о дружбе, сотрудничестве и взаимопомощи) was a standard Russian language reference to various treaties both internally, between the Soviet Republics, and externally, with countries considered friendly. This terminology is still in use for some post-Soviet states. The terminology was used in many so-called "friendship treaties" the Soviet Union made, but also was used in the Warsaw Pact.

In the United States, these types of treaties are commonly a Treaty of Friendship, Commerce and Navigation. More than a hundred "Treaties of Friendship, Commerce, and Navigation" have been signed since independence. Since 1946, these treaties have dealt with commercial matters concerned with the protection of persons, natural and juridical, and of the property and interests of such persons. They define the treatment each country owes the nationals of the other; their rights to engage in business and other activities within the boundaries of the former; and the respect due them, their property and their enterprises.

== List of friendship treaties ==
List of Friendship Treaties
| Signatories | Treaty | Date signed |
|---|---|---|
| Electorate of Hanover; Russian Empire | Treaty of Friendship of Hanover | 3 July 1710 |
| Mosquito Nation; Great Britain | Treaty of Friendship and Alliance | 16 March 1740 |
| France; United States | Treaty of Amity and Commerce (United States–France) | 6 February 1778 |
| Prussia; United States | Treaty of Amity and Commerce (Prussia–United States) | 10 September 1795 |
| Morocco; United States | Moroccan–American Treaty of Friendship | 28 June 1786 |
| Ottoman Empire; United States | Treaty of Tripoli (Treaty of Peace and Friendship between the United States of America and the Bey and Subjects of Tripoli of Barbary) | 4 November 1796 |
| Johor; United Kingdom | Singapore Treaty of Friendship and Alliance | 6 February 1819 |
| Johor; United Kingdom | Crawfurd Treaty (Treaty of Friendship and Alliance between the Honourable East India Company, and the Sultan and the Temenggong of Johore) | 2 August 1824 |
| Argentina; United Kingdom | Treaty of Friendship, Commerce and Navigation Between Argentina and the United Kingdom | 1825 |
| Hawaii; United States | Hawaii-United States Treaty of Friendship, Commerce and Navigation | 1849 |
| Brunei; United States | Brunei–United States Treaty of Peace, Friendship, Commerce and Navigation | 23 June 1850 |
| Japan; United Kingdom | Anglo-Japanese Friendship Treaty | 14 October 1854 |
| Argentina; Prussia (Zollverein) | Friendship, Commerce and Navigation Treaty Between the German Zollverein and the Argentine Confederation | 19 September 1857 |
| Japan; Prussia | Treaty of Amity and Commerce between Prussia and Japan | 24 January 1861 |
| China; Prussia | Friendship, Commerce and Navigation Treaty between Prussia and China | 2 September 1861 |
| Prussia (Zollverein) (Thailand) Siam | Friendship, Commerce and Navigation Treaty Between the German Zollverein and Thailand | 7 February 1862 |
| Liberia; North Germany (Zollverein) | Friendship, Commerce and Navigation Treaty Between the North German Confederation and the Republic of Liberia | 31 October 1867 |
| Japan; North Germany (Zollverein) | Friendship, Commerce and Navigation Treaty Between the German Zollverein and Japan | 20 February 1869 |
| Mexico; North Germany (Zollverein) | Friendship, Commerce and Navigation Treaty Between the North German Confederation and the United States of Mexico | 28 August 1869 |
| Serbia; United Kingdom | Anglo–Serbian Treaty of Friendship and Commerce | 7 February 1870 |
| North Germany (Zollverein); El Salvador | Friendship, Commerce and Navigation Treaty Between the German Zollverein and El Salvador | 13 June 1870 |
| German Empire; Persia | Friendship, Commerce and Navigation Treaty Between the German Empire and Persia | 11 June 1873 |
| Costa Rica; German Empire | Friendship, Commerce and Navigation Treaty Between the German Empire and Costa Rica | 18 May 1875 |
| German Empire; Tonga | Treaty of Friendship between the German Empire and Tonga | 1 November 1876 |
| German Empire; Samoa | Treaty of Friendship Between the German Empire and Samoa | 24 January 1879 |
| German Empire; Hawaiian Kingdom | Friendship, Commerce, Navigation Consular Treaty Between the German Empire and the Hawaiian Kingdom | 10 February 1880 |
| Korea; United States | United States–Korea Treaty of 1882 | 22 May 1882 |
| German Empire; Mexico | Friendship, Commerce and Navigation Treaty Between the German Empire and the United States of Mexico | 5 December 1882 |
| German Empire; Joseon | Friendship, Commerce and Navigation Treaty Between the German Empire and the Kingdom of Korea | 26 November 1883 |
| German Empire; Zanzibar | Friendship, Commerce, Navigation and Consular Treaty Between the German Empire and the Sultanate of Zanzibar | 20 December 1885 |
| German Empire; South African Republic | Friendship and Commerce Treaty Between the German Empire and the South African Republic | 22 January 1886 |
| Ecuador; German Empire | Treaty of Friendship Between the German Empire and Ecuador | 28 March 1887 |
| German Empire; Guatemala | Friendship, Commerce, Navigation and Consular Treaty Between the German Empire and Guatemala | 20 September 1887 |
| German Empire; Honduras | Friendship, Commerce, Navigation and Consular Treaty Between the German Empire and Honduras | 12 December 1887 |
| German Empire; Ottoman Empire | Friendship, Commerce and Navigation Treaty Between the German Empire and the Ottoman Empire | 26 August 1890 |
| Colombia; German Empire | Friendship, Commerce and Navigation Treaty Between the German Empire and Colombia | 23 July 1892 |
| Brazil; Japan | Treaty of Friendship, Commerce and Navigation between Brazil and Japan | 1895 |
| German Empire; Nicaragua | Friendship, Commerce Navigation, and Consular Treaty Between the German Empire and Nicaragua | 4 February 1896 |
| German Empire; Orange Free State | Friendship and Commerce Treaty Between the German Empire and the Orange Free State | 28 April 1897 |
| Tonga; United Kingdom | Treaty of Friendship between Tonga and the United Kingdom. | 18 May 1900 |
| Bolivia; Chile | Treaty of Peace and Friendship (1904) | 20 October 1904 |
| Ethiopian Empire; German Empire | German-Ethiopian Friendship and Commerce Treaty | 7 March 1905 |
| German Empire; Venezuela | Friendship, Commerce and Navigation Treaty Between the German Empire and Venezuela | 26 January 1909 |
| Mongolia; Tibet | Treaty of friendship and alliance between the Government of Mongolia and Tibet | 11 January 1913 |
| Persia; Russian SFSR | Russo-Persian Treaty of Friendship | 26 February 1921 |
| Turkey; Russian SFSR | Treaty of Moscow (1921) (Note: The preamble of the treaty stating that it is a "Treaty of Friendship and Brotherhood") | 16 March 1921 |
| Mongolia; Russian SFSR | Agreement between the Government of the RSFSR and the People's Government of Mongolia on the Establishment of Friendly Relations between Russia and Mongolia | 5 November 1921 |
| Germany; United States | Treaty of Friendship, Commerce and Consular Relations between Germany and the United States of America | 8 December 1923 |
| Russian SFSR; Tannu-Tuva | Treaty between the RSFSR and the Tannu-Tuvan People's Republic on the Establishment of Friendly Relations | 22 June 1925 |
| Kingdom of Bulgaria; Turkey | Treaty of Angora (Treaty of Friendship between Bulgaria and Turkey) | 18 October 1925 |
| Germany; Soviet Union | Treaty of Berlin (1926) (Note: The term used is freundschaftlich.) | 24 February 1926 |
| Mongolia; Tannu-Tuva | Treaty of Friendship and Mutual Recognition | 16 August 1926 |
| Kingdom of Italy; Ethiopian Empire | Italo-Ethiopian Treaty of 1928 (Italo–Ethiopian Treaty of Friendship and Arbitration) | 2 August 1928 |
| Portugal; Spain | Portuguese–Spanish Treaty of Friendship and Non-Aggression | 17 March 1939 |
| Nazi Germany; Kingdom of Italy | Pact of Friendship and Alliance between Germany and Italy | 22 May 1939 |
| Nazi Germany; Soviet Union | German–Soviet Treaty of Friendship, Cooperation and Demarcation | 23 August 1939 |
| Nazi Germany; Turkey | German–Turkish Treaty of Friendship | 18 June 1941 |
| Ecuador; Peru | Rio Protocol aka Protocol of Friendship and Peace | 29 January 1942 |
| China; Soviet Union | Sino-Soviet Treaty of Friendship and Alliance | 14 August 1945 |
| China; United States | Treaty of Friendship, Commerce and Navigation between the United States of America and the Republic of China | 4 November 1946 |
| Finland; Soviet Union | Finno-Soviet Treaty of 1948 | 8 April 1948 |
| India; Bhutan | 1949 Indo-Bhutan Treaty of Peace and Friendship | 9 August 1949 |
| India; Nepal | 1950 Indo-Nepal Treaty of Peace and Friendship | 31 July 1950 |
| Greece; Turkey; Yugoslavia | Balkan Pact (1953) | 28 February 1953 |
| Albania; Bulgaria; Czechoslovakia; East Germany; Hungary; Poland; Romania | Warsaw Pact (Treaty of Friendship, Cooperation and Mutual Assistance) | 14 May 1955 |
| Iran; United States | Treaty of Amity, Economic Relations and Consular Rights (Note: Article 1: There shall be firm and enduring peace and sincere friendship between the United States of America and Iran.) | 15 August 1955 |
| China; East Germany | Treaty for Friendship and Cooperation Between the GDR and the People's Republic of China | 25 December 1955 |
| Netherlands; United States | DAFT (Dutch-American Friendship Treaty) | 27 March 1956 |
| East Germany; Mongolia | Treaty for Friendship and Cooperation Between the GDR and the Mongolian People's Republic | 22 August 1957 |
| Indonesia; Malaya | Treaty of Friendship between the Federation of Malaya and the Republic of Indonesia | 17 April 1959 |
| North Korea; Soviet Union | The DPRK-Soviet Union Treaty of Friendship, Cooperation and Mutual Assistance | 6 July 1961 |
| China; North Korea | Sino-North Korean Mutual Aid and Cooperation Friendship Treaty | 11 July 1961 |
| New Zealand; Samoa | Treaty of Friendship | 1 August 1962 |
| France; West Germany | Élysée Treaty aka Treaty of Friendship | 22 January 1963 |
| India; Soviet Union | Indo-Soviet Treaty of Friendship and Cooperation | August 1971 |
| Bangladesh; India | Indo-Bangla Treaty of Friendship, Cooperation and Peace | 19 March 1972 |
| Australia; Japan | Basic Treaty of Friendship and Cooperation | 16 June 1976 |
| Portugal; Spain | Treaty of Friendship and Cooperation between Spain and Portugal | 2 November 1977 |
| East Germany; Vietnam | Treaty for Friendship and Cooperation Between the GDR and the Socialist Republic of Viet Nam | 4 December 1977 |
| China; Japan | Treaty of Peace and Friendship between Japan and China | 12 August 1978 |
| Afghanistan; Soviet Union | Soviet-Afghan Treaty of Friendship | 12 December 1978 |
| Angola; East Germany | Treaty for Friendship and Cooperation Between the GDR and the People's Republic of Angola | 24 February 1979 |
| East Germany; Mozambique | Treaty for Friendship and Cooperation Between the GDR and the People's Republic of Mozambique | 24 February 1979 |
| Cambodia; Vietnam | Treaty of Peace, Friendship and Cooperation | 1979 |
| Kiribati; United States | Treaty of Tarawa aka Treaty of Friendship Between the United States of America and the Republic of Kiribati | 20 September 1979 |
| Ethiopia; East Germany | Treaty for Friendship and Cooperation Between the GDR and Socialist Ethiopia | 15 November 1979 |
| East Germany; South Yemen | Treaty for Friendship and Cooperation Between the GDR and the People's Democratic Republic of Yemen | 15 November 1979 |
| Cambodia; East Germany | Treaty for Friendship and Cooperation Between the GDR and the People's Republic of Kampuchea | 18 March 1980 |
| Cuba; East Germany | Treaty for Friendship and Cooperation Between the GDR and the Republic of Cuba | 18 March 1980 |
| Equatorial Guinea; Spain | Treaty of Friendship and Cooperation between Spain and Equatorial Guinea of 1980 | 23 October 1980 |
| Afghanistan; East Germany | Treaty for Friendship and Cooperation Between the GDR and the Democratic Republic of Afghanistan | 21 May 1982 |
| East Germany; Laos | Treaty for Friendship and Cooperation Between the GDR and the Lao People's Democratic Republic | 22 September 1982 |
| East Germany; North Korea | Treaty for Friendship and Cooperation Between the GDR and the Democratic People's Republic of Korea | 1 June 1984 |
| Argentina; Chile | Treaty of Peace and Friendship of 1984 between Chile and Argentina | 29 November 1984 |
| Russia; Germany | Treaty of Neighbourhood, Partnership and Cooperation | 5 July 1991 |
| Finland; Russia | Neighborhood agreement (Naapuruussopimus) on Friendship, Basics of relationships, Territorial integrity and Cooperation | 20 January 1992 |
| Kazakhstan; Russia | Kazakh-Russian Agreement on Friendship, Cooperation and Mutual Assistance | 25 May 1992 |
| Tajikistan; Russia | Russia-Tajikistan Agreement on Friendship, Cooperation and Mutual Assistance | 25 May 1993 |
| Russia; Ukraine | Russian–Ukrainian Friendship Treaty | 31 May 1997 |
| North Korea; Russia | North Korea-Russia Treaty of 2000 | 9 February 2000 |
| China; Russia | 2001 Sino-Russian Treaty of Friendship | 16 July 2001 |
| Italy; Libya | 2008 Treaty of Benghazi | 30 August 2008 |
| Bulgaria; North Macedonia | Treaty of Friendship, Good-Neighbourliness and Cooperation | 1 August, 2017 |
| Germany; United Kingdom | Kensington Treaty (Treaty between the United Kingdom […] and […] Germany on Friendship and Bilateral Cooperation) | 17 July 2025 |

== See also ==
- Treaty
- Commercial treaty
- List of treaties
