= Luís Pereira (disambiguation) =

Luís Pereira (born 1949) is a Brazilian footballer.

Luís Pereira may also refer to:

- Luís Manuel Pereira (born 1981), Portuguese footballer
- Luis Pereira Cotapos (1835–1909), Chilean lawyer and politician
- Luis Pereira Íñiguez (born 1876), Chilean politician and lawyer
- Luis Pereira (Panamanian footballer) (born 1996), Panamanian footballer
- Luís Moniz Pereira (born 1947), Portuguese professor of computer science
- Luís Teotónio Pereira (1895–1990), Portuguese politician and diplomat

== See also ==
- Estádio Luís Pereira, defunct stadium in Ribeirão Preto, São Paulo, Brazil
