= Jacques Cohen =

Jacques Cohen may refer to:

- Jacques Cohen (embryologist) (born 1951), Dutch embryologist
- Jacques Cohen (computer scientist), Brazilian computer scientist
- Jacques Cohen (actor) (1930–2016), Israeli actor
