= Portugal–Spain relations =

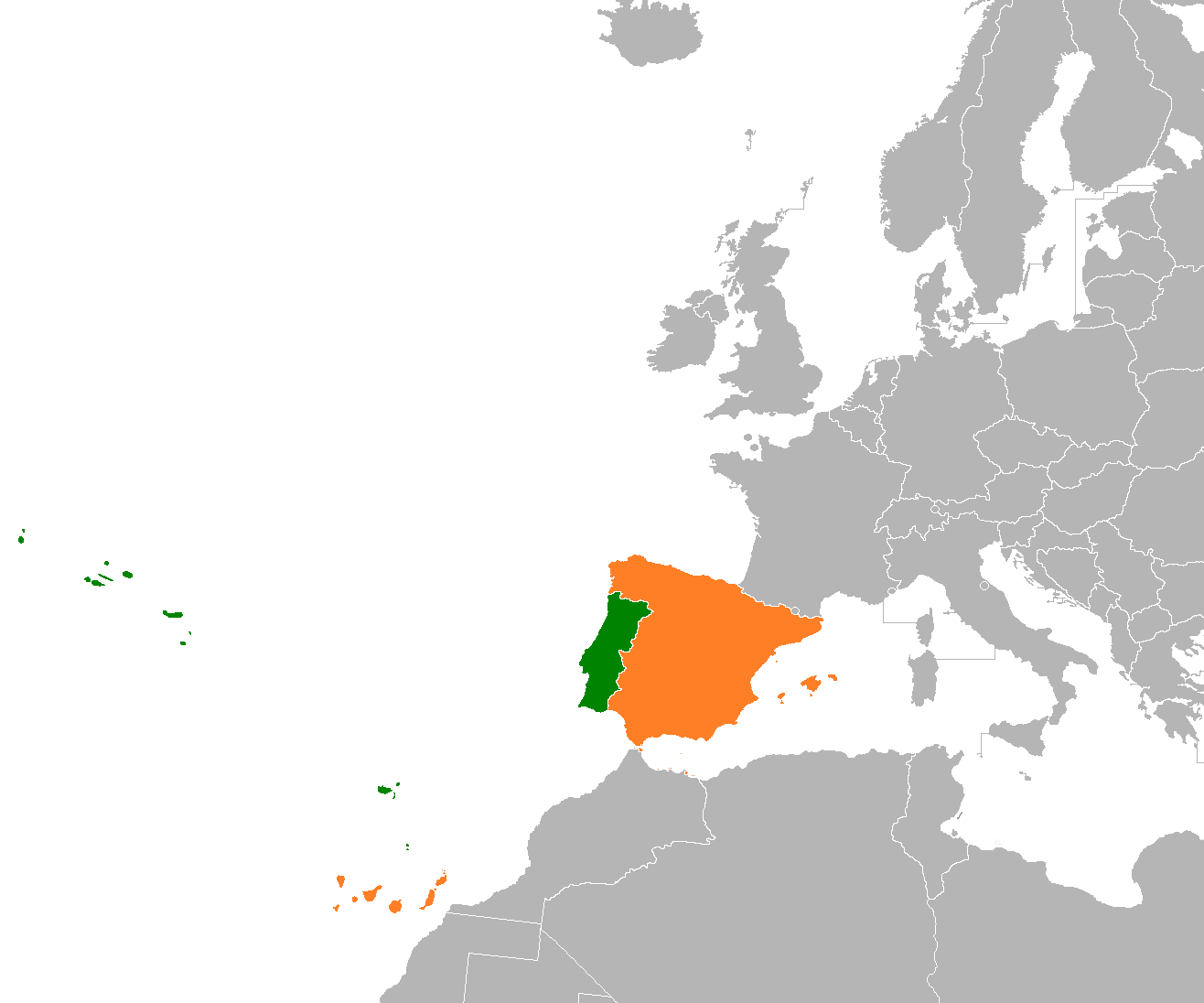
- Portugal: Spain

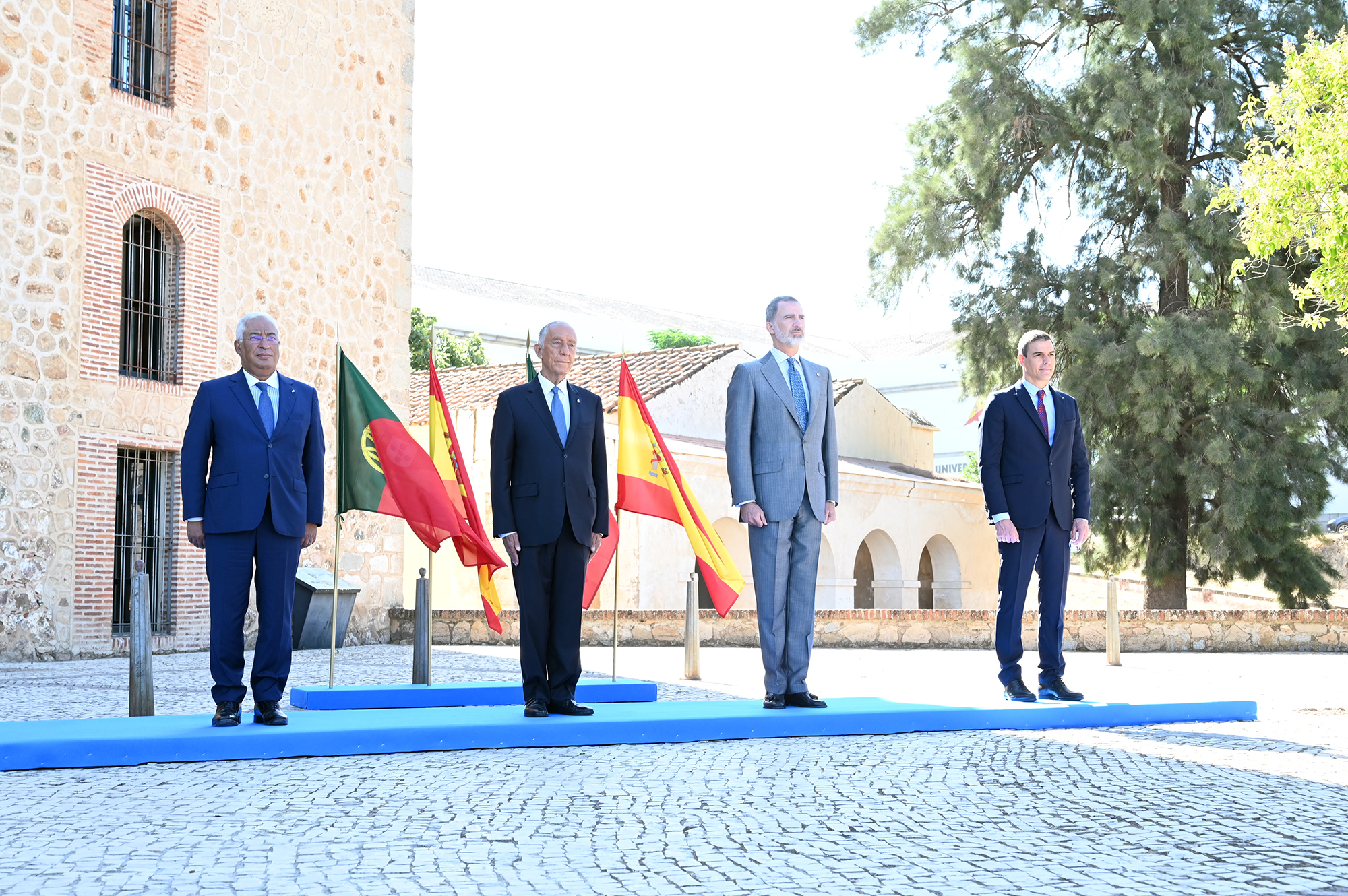
Portuguese and Spanish premiers António Costa and Pedro Sánchez, alongside Portuguese President Marcelo Rebelo de Sousa and King Felipe VI of Spain during the reopening ceremony of the Portugal-Spain border (which had been closed due to the COVID-19 pandemic), on 1 July 2020

Portugal–Spain relations are closely aligned with one another, underpinned by shared membership of the Ibero-American Summit, Council of Europe, European Union, Eurozone, Schengen Area and NATO, and make up the vast majority of the Iberian Peninsula and Macaronesia.

== History ==
=== Reconquista ===
After the Umayyad conquest of the Iberian Peninsula, a long process of reconquest (in Portuguese and Spanish: Reconquista) began. The Battle of Covadonga and the establishment of the Kingdom of Asturias are often regarded as the starting points of the process. Several Christian kingdoms emerged in the peninsula thereafter.

The County of Portucale, successively a vassal of the Kingdoms of Asturias, Galicia and León, eventually rebelled and won the Battle of São Mamede on 24 June 1128, It was led by Afonso Henriques, who, after defeating the Moors in the Battle of Ourique, proclaimed himself King of Portugal on 25 July 1139. Portugal's independence was recognized in 1143 by King Alfonso VII of León and in 1179 by Pope Alexander III. Portugal's Reconquista finished in 1249.

Spain began with the Union of the Crowns of Castile and Aragon in 1469 although it was not until 1516 that they had a single unified King. Until then, the word "Hispania" was only a geographic location and referred exclusively to the Iberian Peninsula. It was only in the Constitution of 1812 that the name "Españas" (Spains) was adopted for the country along, with the use of the title of "king of the Spains". The Constitution of 1876 adopted for the first time the name "Spain" for the Spanish state, and from then onward, its kings used the title of "King of Spain". The Reconquista was finally over with the Fall of Granada in 1492.

An attempt to unite all of the Iberian medieval kingdoms failed with the death in 1500 of Miguel da Paz, Prince of Portugal, Asturias, Girona and Viana.

=== Overseas expansion ===
Portugal's copy of the Treaty of Tordesillas (1494) divided the New World between Portugal and Castile. During the 15th century, Portugal built increasingly large fleets of ships and began to explore the world beyond Europe, sending explorers to Africa and Asia. Castile followed suit decades later. Following the first Spanish voyage of Christopher Columbus to the Caribbean in 1492, both states began acquiring territory in the New World. As a result of the 1494 Treaty of Tordesillas, Portugal acquired its most potentially important colony, Brazil (much of South America), as well as a number of possessions in Africa and Asia, and Castile took the rest of South America and much of the North America, as well as a number of possessions in Africa, Oceania and Asia as the important colony of the Philippines.

The line of demarcation was about halfway between the Cape Verde Islands (already Portuguese) and the islands claimed for Castile by Columbus on his first voyage. Although the Treaty of Tordesillas attempted to clarify their empires, many subsequent treaties were needed to establish the modern boundaries of Brazil and the 1529 Treaty of Zaragoza was needed to demarcate their Asian possessions.

=== Iberian Union ===
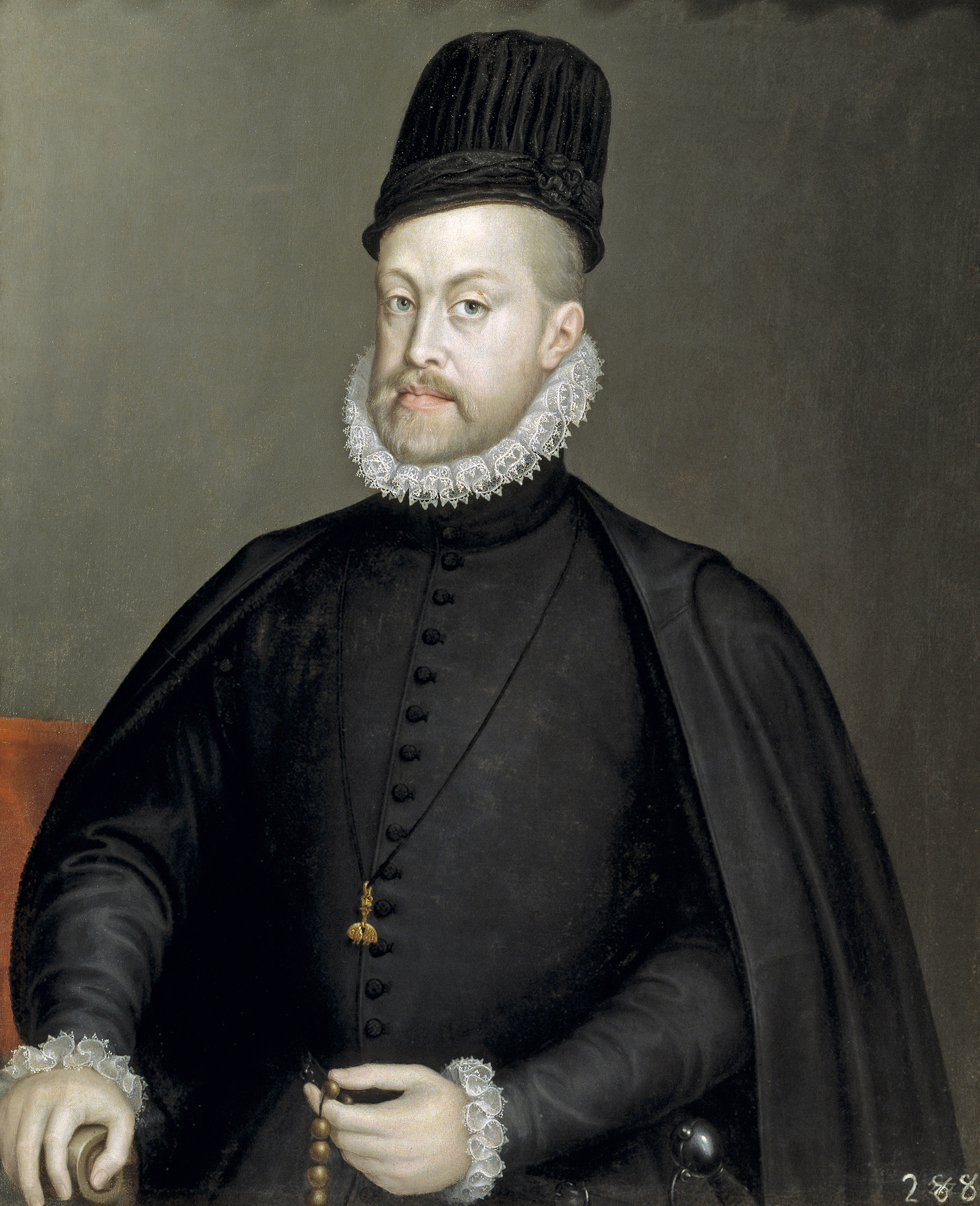
King Philip II of Spain was crowned King Philip I of Portugal in 1580. He did not officially unite the two kingdoms.

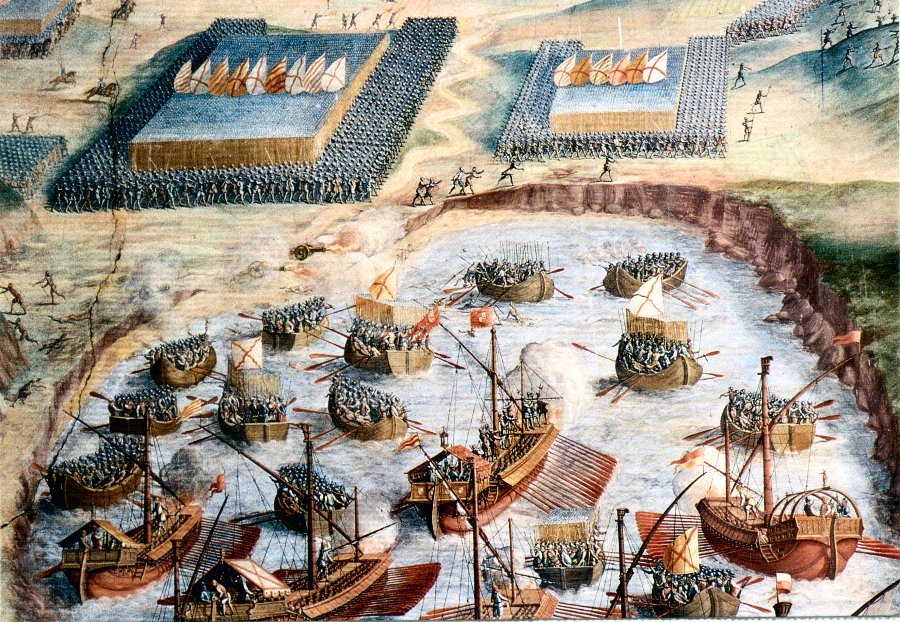
Habsburg Tercios landing at the Battle of Ponta Delgada.

In 1578, King Sebastian of Portugal died in the Battle of Alcácer Quibir against the Moroccans and the Ottomans. Having no heirs, he was succeeded by his great-uncle Henry of Portugal, who reigned until his death (31 January 1580).

Henry also lacked heirs and his death triggered a succession crisis in which the main claimants to the throne were Philip II of Spain and Anthony, Prior of Crato. After the Spanish victory in the War of Portuguese Succession Philip of Spain was crowned king in 1581 and started a personal union between the two nations, known as the Iberian Union, that generated a decline of the Portuguese Empire. The Iberian Union lasted for almost sixty years until 1640, when the Portuguese Restoration War was initiated against Spain, and Portugal re-established the Portuguese dynasty under the House of Bragança.

=== 18th century ===
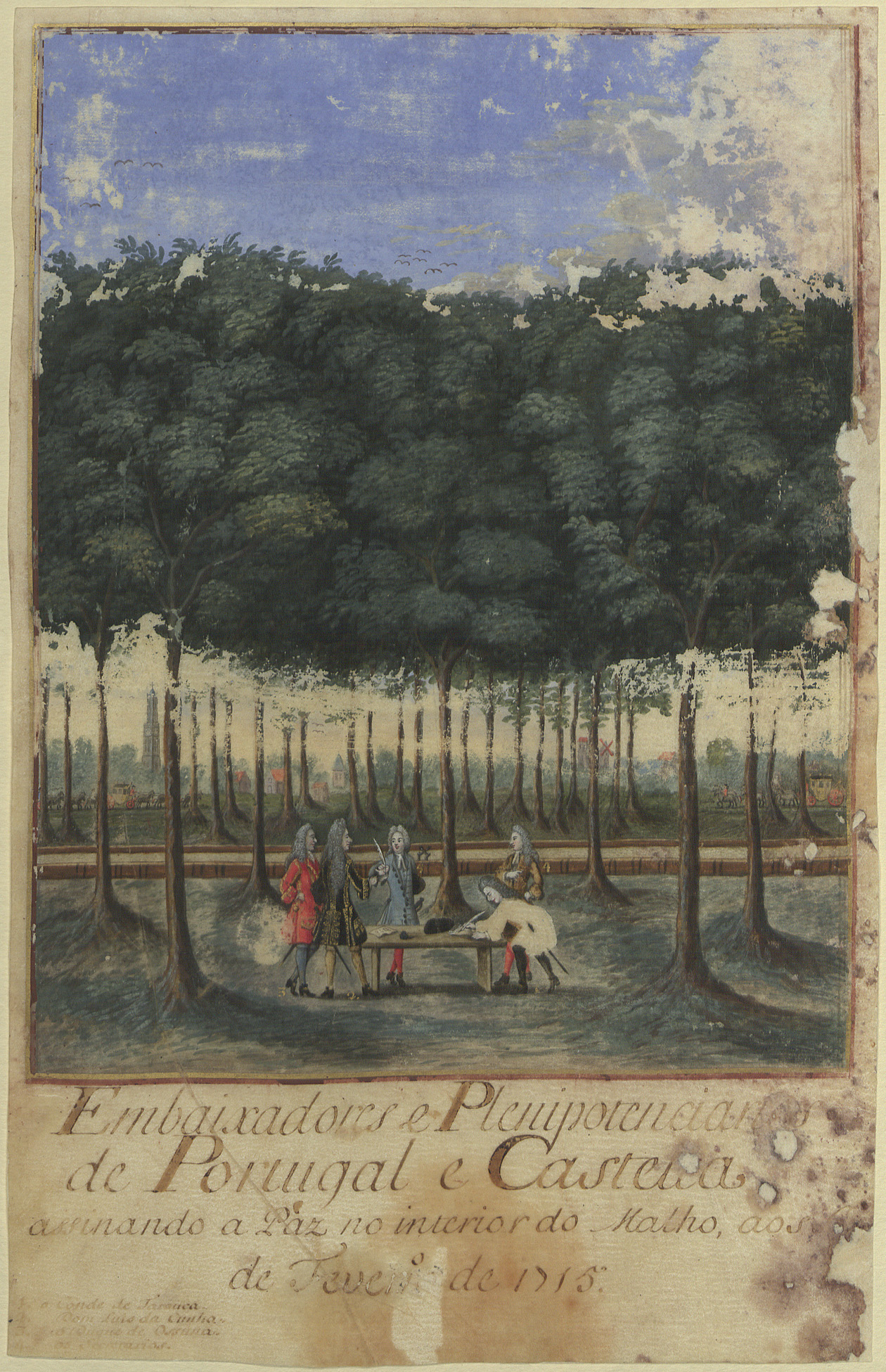
Signature of the Treaty of Utrecht between Portugal and Spain, in the Maliebaan, on 6 February 1715. The Dom Tower is visible in the background. From left to right: the Duke of Osuna, in red coat, Luís da Cunha, in black coat, the Secretaries, in blue and yellow coats, and the Count of Tarouca, crouched.

During the 18th-century wars, which were often fought by the major powers to maintain the European balance of power, Spain and Portugal usually found themselves on opposite sides. The Portuguese, courtesy of their long-standing alliance, aligned themselves with Great Britain, and Spain, through the Pacte de Famille, allied itself to France. In 1762, during the Seven Years' War, Spain launched an unsuccessful invasion of Portugal.

In 1777, there was a conflict between the two states over the borders of their possessions in South America.

=== 19th century and Napoleonic era ===
The War of the Oranges (Portuguese: Guerra das Laranjas; French: Guerre des Oranges; Spanish: Guerra de las Naranjas) was a brief conflict in 1801 in which Spanish forces, instigated by the French government and ultimately supported by the French military, invaded Portugal. It was a precursor to the Peninsular Wars, resulting in the Treaty of Badajoz, the loss of Portuguese territory, particularly Olivenza, as well as ultimately setting the stage for the complete invasion of the Iberian Peninsula by Spanish and French forces.

In 1807, the king of Spain and his French allies invaded Portugal successfully and unusually quickly by using a route that crossed through Spanish territory. However, the French decided to take over both countries and so overthrew the King of Spain and forced the Portuguese royal family to escape to the Portuguese colony of Brazil. Spain and Portugal subsequently became allies for the first time in centuries and, allied to a British army under Sir Arthur Wellesley, drove the French back across the border in 1813 after a prolonged, brutal and victorious conflict for Spain and Portugal against the French that is known as the Peninsular War.

After the fall of Napoleon, both countries came close to war a number of times during the early 19th century. Both lost their American colonies shortly after the end of the Peninsular War, which severely weakened their global power.

=== 1930s ===
Comparison of life expectancy in Spain and Portugal

The 1930s saw similar right-leaning, authoritarian and nationalist regimes emerge in both countries. In Portugal, António de Oliveira Salazar established his Estado Novo in 1933. In 1936, Francisco Franco launched a coup against the Spanish government, and after the three-year Spanish Civil War, his Nationalists were triumphant.

Both states remained neutral in World War II though Spain was more predisposed to Nazi Germany. Portugal also maintained a friendly relationship with Nazi Germany by supplying it with many key resources such as tungsten. Yet, in virtue of the 14th-century alliance Portugal had with England, it was also supplying Britain with all sorts of produce, and whilst the Germans had to pay immediately, Britain had an open account for most of the war. Later in the war, the Estado Novo regime agreed to the leasing of the Azores as a bases for Allied operations in Europe.

World War II came to a close in 1945. With the Allies victorious, a new status quo was set which favored regimes which were more ideologically similar to the victors. While Portugal and Spain were not democratic states, Portugal's membership in NATO as a founding father made Portugal less isolated than its counterpart, Spain, which was unable to join NATO because of its relationship with the Axis during World War II. However, Spain, like Portugal, still opposed the Soviet-led Warsaw Pact, and both considered that communist and other left-wing movements threatened their regimes. Yet, the two nations suffered politically and economically because of their reluctance to liberalising their national economies and their stifling of freedoms to preserve order and political supremacy.

While the other European colonial powers, such as France, the United Kingdom and the Netherlands, gave up their colonial empires in the post-war years, both Spain and Portugal clung to their possessions around the globe. Portugal fought a costly colonial war in Africa and in 1961 saw its territory of Goa invaded by India. Despite their apparent mutual self-interest, there was very little co-operation between Spain and Portugal when it came to defending their empires.

=== End of isolation ===
In 1974, the dictatorship of the Estado Novo was brought to an end by a military coup known as the Carnation Revolution. That left Spain increasingly isolated from the rest of Europe until the death of Franco a year later after which Spain returned to being a constitutional monarchy and embraced parliamentarism. The PREC, which had followed the Carnation Revolution in Portugal, came to an end in 1976, and Portugal then also became a democracy. The two new democracies signed the Treaty of Friendship and Cooperation between Spain and Portugal in 1977, which replaced the Iberian Pact, which had been signed in 1939, whilst both countries were autocratic.

The two countries gave independence to their former colonies, liberalised their economies and began the process of applying for membership of the European Economic Community. In 1986, both of them formally entered the Community, which is now known as the European Union, pursuant to the ratification of the Treaty of Lisbon.

== Present ==
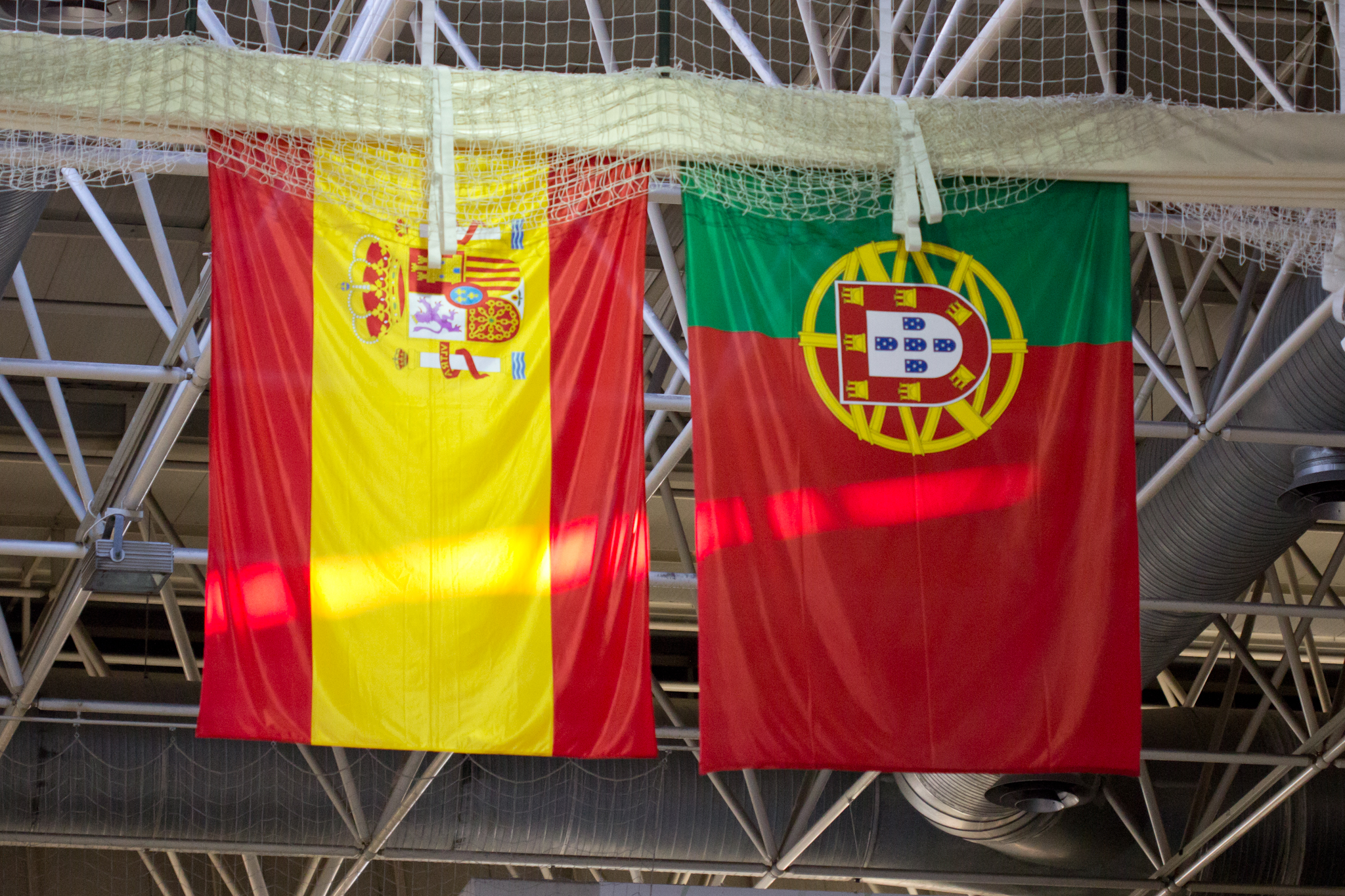
Flags of Spain and Portugal at a friendly volleyball game between their national teams.

Current relations between Spain and Portugal are excellent. They cooperate in the fight against drug trafficking and forest fires (common in the Iberian Peninsula in summers), for example. These close relations are facilitated by similar governments; such as the conservative governments of José María Aznar and José Manuel Durão Barroso and the social democratic governments of José Luis Rodríguez Zapatero and José Sócrates and between Pedro Sánchez and António Costa. Sócrates even claims that he has one of the best personal relations with Zapatero among international political relationships.

In 1998, both countries signed the Albufeira Convention, an agreement on the sharing of trans-boundary rivers such as the Douro, Tagus and Guadiana. The convention superseded an original agreement on the Douro, signed in 1927, that was expanded in 1964 and 1968 to include tributaries. The Albufeira Convention governs the equitable use of water and environmental concerns.

In 2009, the two countries submitted an unsuccessful joint bid to host either the 2018 or the 2022 FIFA World Cup.

In 2020, Portugal Prime Minister António Costa criticised the words of Dutch Finance Minister, who had called for an investigation into Spain's proclaimed lack of budgetary capacity to cope with the COVID-19 pandemic by describing them as "repugnant". The same year, both countries also held a solemn border opening ceremony, which had been closed because of the COVID-19 pandemic crisis. They also announced, on 7 October, a joint bid to host the 2030 FIFA World Cup.

On 28 October 2021, Portugal and Spain signed a new Treaty of Friendship and Cooperation that renovated but did not repeal the one signed in 1977. That was during the 32nd Iberian Summit, held in Trujillo, Spain, between the governments of Pedro Sánchez and António Costa. They also signed agreements relative to fish & game in the international river border of the Miño and to the launch of a Statute of the Cross-Border Worker.

== Later disputes ==
=== Olivenza ===
There is an unsettled territorial dispute on the Portugal–Spain border regarding the municipality of Olivenza (Portuguese: Olivença) and the smaller municipality of Táliga, both currently administered as a part of the Spanish province of Badajoz, in the autonomous community of Extremadura. Olivenza had been under continuous Portuguese sovereignty since prior to 1297 when it was occupied by Spain in 1801 and formally ceded by Portugal later that year by the Treaty of Badajoz. Spain claims de jure sovereignty over Olivenza on the grounds that the Treaty of Badajoz still stands and has never been revoked.

Portugal claims de jure sovereignty over Olivenza / Olivença on the grounds that the Treaty of Badajoz was revoked by its own terms (which stated that the breach of any of its articles would lead to its cancellation) when Spain invaded Portugal in the Peninsular War of 1807 and, foremost, when Spain signed the Treaty of Vienna in 1815, which according to Portugal, recognizes Olivenza as Portuguese territory.

=== Savage Islands' EEZ ===
Recently, Spain has also initiated a diffuse dispute regarding the Portugal's Exclusive Economic Zone (EEZ) in the waters around the Savage Islands (a small archipelago north of the Canary Islands), under Portuguese sovereignty. Spain objects on the basis that the Savage Islands do not have a separate continental shelf, according to the article 121 of the United Nations Convention on the Law of the Sea. The status of the Savage Islands as islands or rocks is thus at the core of the current dispute, mainly because of the area's interest regarding fishing and potential seabed mining. Today, the Savage Islands constitute a natural reserve, whose inhabitants are a small Portuguese Marine Corps combat detachment and two wardens of Madeira's Natural Park. Over the years the Portuguese authorities have seized some Spanish fishing boats and crew around the area for illegal fishing and theft of light beacons and navigation buoys.

=== Almaraz Nuclear Power Plant and nuclear storage ===
As of 2017, Spain had approved a nuclear waste warehouse next to the Almaraz Nuclear Power Plant (which uses the Tagus river that flows into Portugal for cooling of the reactors), which is near the Portugal–Spain border, without carrying out any consultations or impact studies. Portugal has escalated the matter to the EU. Protests were planned for 12 January 2017 at Spanish consulates and organised by Movimiento Ibérico Antinuclear. That coincided with a meeting between Portuguese and Spanish delegates in Madrid. The meeting ended in deadlock, and Portugal complained to the EU that Spain ignored potential cross-border impact, allegedly with no studies being carried out, which Portugal considers against EU rules according to Portugal.

Spanish secretary of State for the EU Jorge Toledo Albiñana said in 2017 that work will start regardless of Portugal's concerns and "uranium bars that will remain radioactive for the next 300 years" will be stored on-site.

== European Union ==
Both countries became members of the European Union in 1986.

== NATO ==
While Portugal was one of the founding members of NATO, Spain joined NATO in 1982.

== Resident diplomatic missions ==
of Portugal in Spain

- Madrid (Embassy)
- Barcelona (Consulate-General)
- Seville (Consulate-General)
- Vigo (Consulate-General)

of Spain in Portugal

- Lisbon (Embassy)
- Lisbon (Consulate-General)
- Porto (Consulate-General)

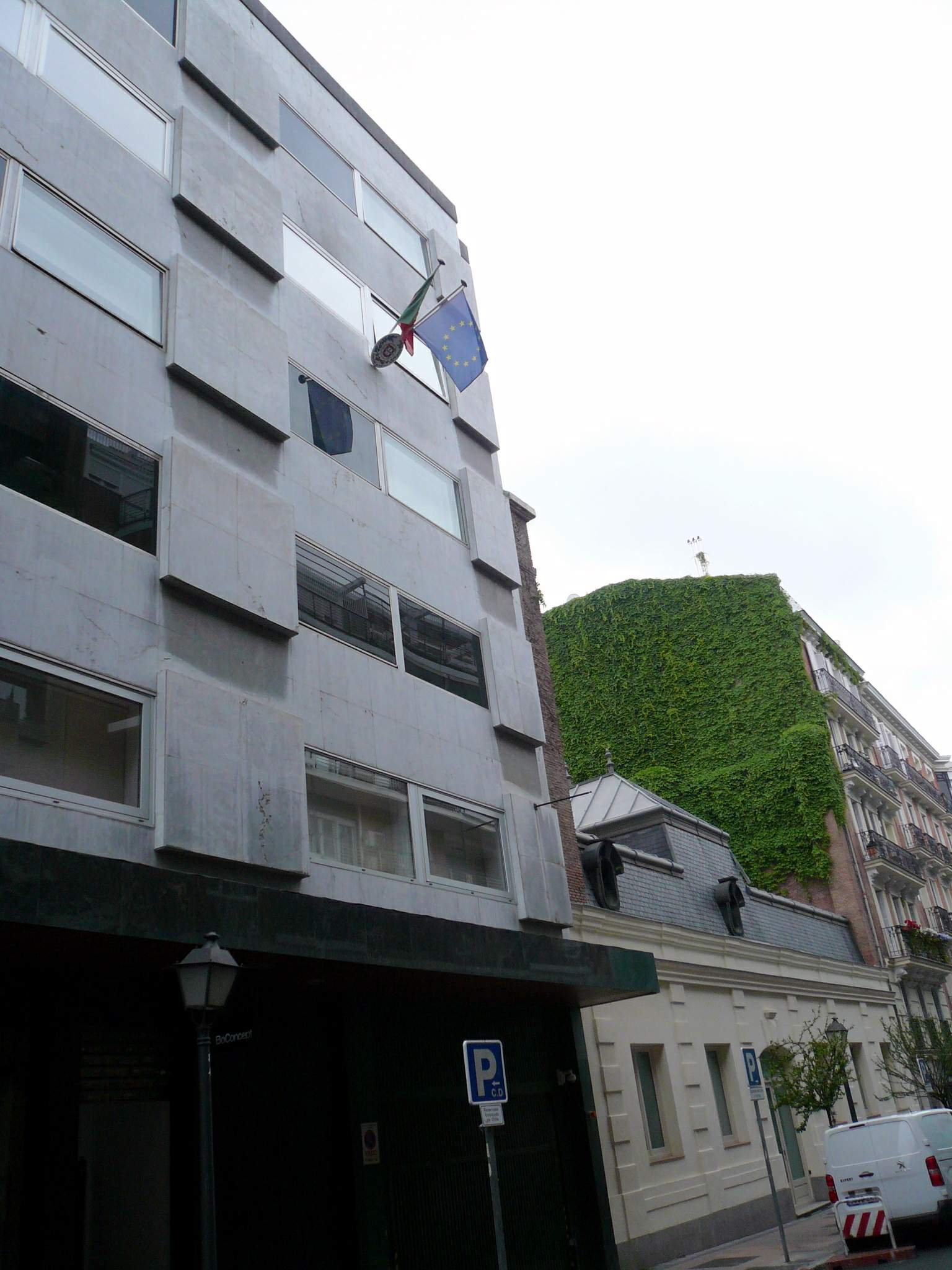
Embassy of Portugal in Madrid

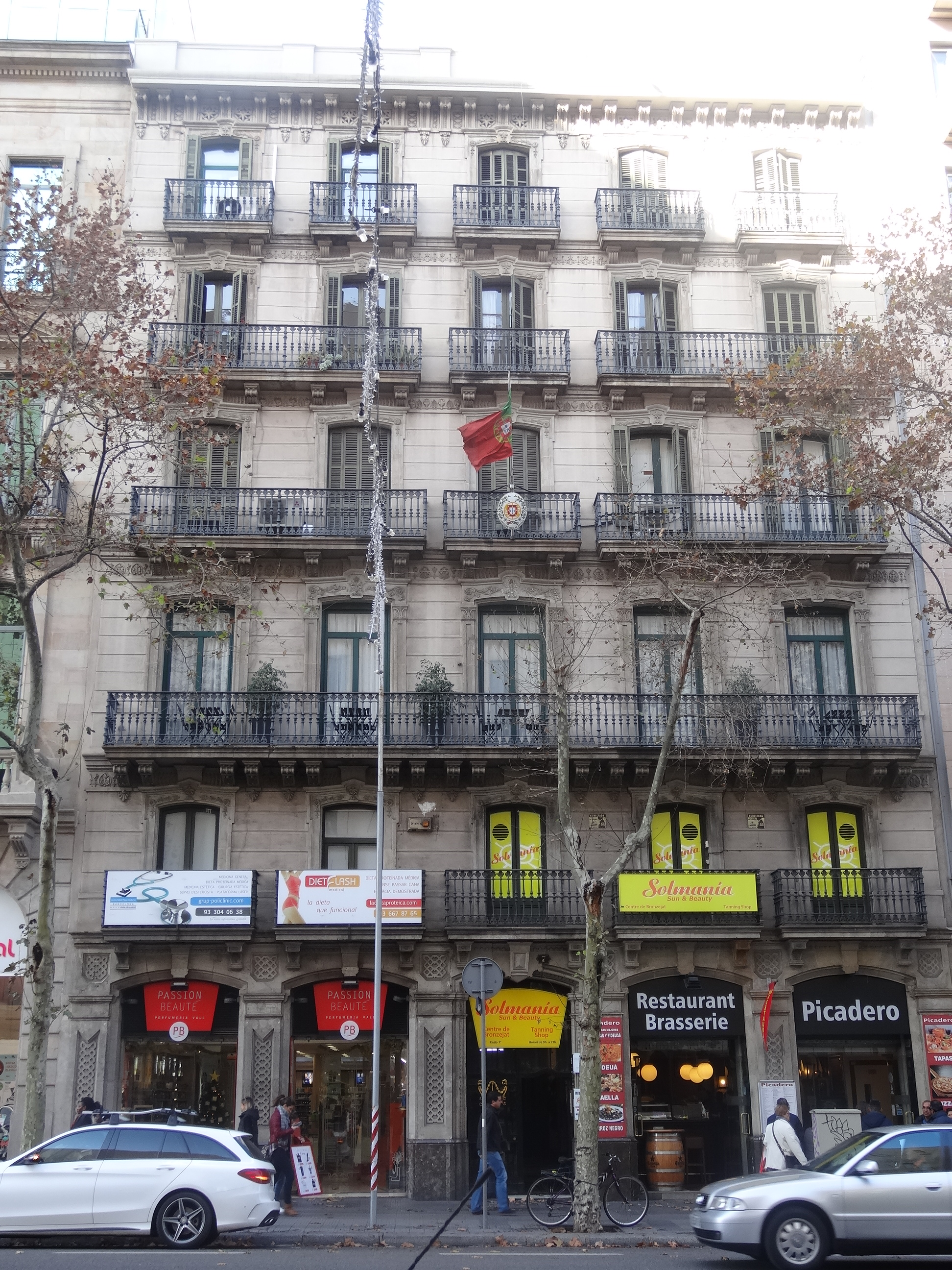
Consulate-General of Portugal in Barcelona

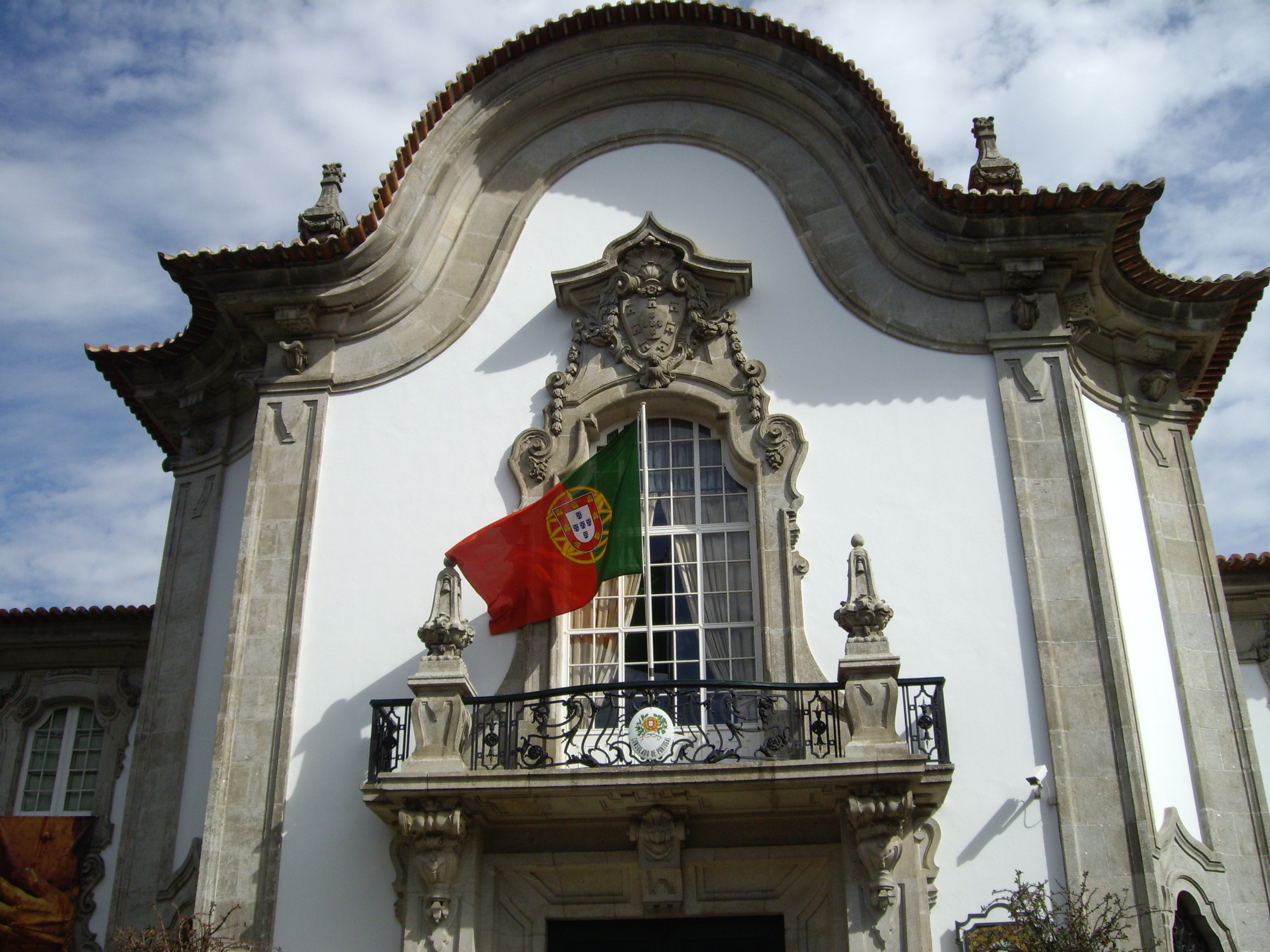
Consulate-General of Portugal in Seville
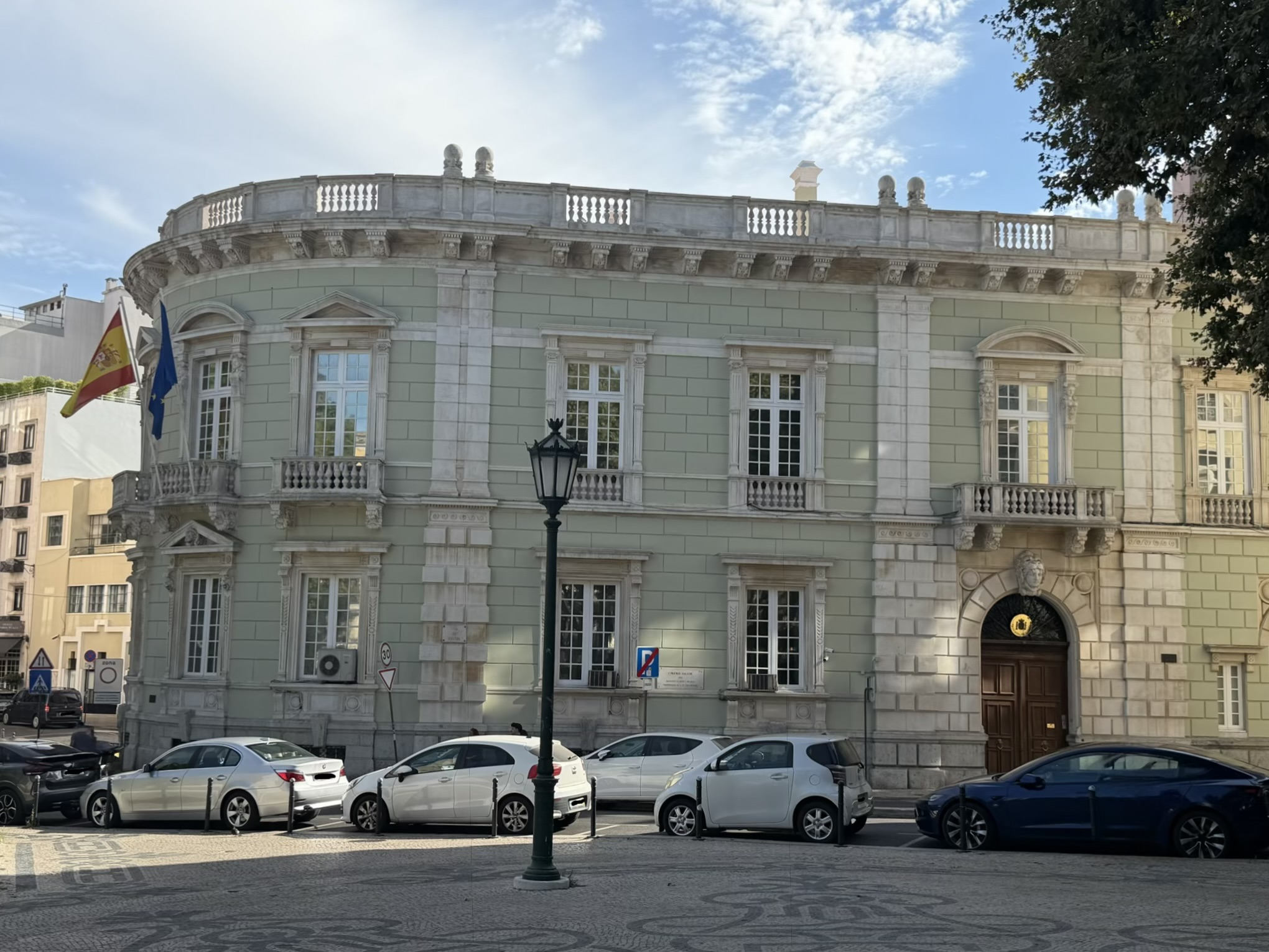
Embassy of Spain in Lisbon

== See also ==
- Iberian Summits
- 1383–85 Crisis
- Spanish irredentism
- Iberism
- Portuñol
