= METEO System =

The METEO System is a machine translation system specifically designed for the translation of the weather forecasts issued daily by Environment Canada. The system was used from 1981 to 30 September 2001 by Environment Canada to translate forecasts issued in French in the province of Quebec into English and those issued in English in other Canadian provinces into French. Since then, a competitor program has replaced METEO System after an open governmental bid.

The system was developed by John Chandioux and was often mentioned as one of the few success stories in the field of machine translation.

== History ==
The METEO System was in operational use at Environment Canada from 1982 to 2001. It stems from a prototype developed in 1975–76 by the TAUM Group, known as TAUM-METEO.

The initial motivation to develop that prototype was that a junior translator came to TAUM to ask for help in translating weather bulletins at Environment Canada. Since all official communications emanating from the Canadian government must be available in French and English, because of the Official Languages Act of 1969, and weather bulletins represent a large amount of translation in real time, junior translators had to spend several months producing first draft translations, which were then revised by seniors. That was a difficult and tedious job, because of the specificities of the English and French sublanguages used, and not very rewarding, as the lifetime of a bulletin is only 4 hours.

TAUM proposed to build a prototype MT system, and Environment Canada agreed to fund the project. A prototype was ready after a few months, with basic integration in the workflow of translation (source and target bulletins travelled over telex lines at the time and MT happened on a mainframe computer). The first version of the system (METEO 1) went into operation on a Control Data CDC 7600 supercomputer in March 1977.

Chandioux then left the TAUM group to manage its operation and improve it, while the TAUM group embarked on a different project (TAUM-aviation, 1977–81). Benoit Thouin made improvements to the initial prototype over the subsequent year, and turned it into an operational system. After three years, METEO 1 had demonstrated the feasibility of microcomputer-based machine translation to the satisfaction of the Canadian government's Translation Bureau of Public Works and Government Services Canada.

METEO 1 was formally adopted in 1981, replacing the junior translators in the workflow. Because of the need for high-quality translation, the revision step, done by senior translators, was maintained. The quality, measured as the percentage of edit operations (inserting or deleting a word counts as 1, replacing as 2) on the MT results, reached 85% in 1985.

Until that time, the MT part was still implemented as a sequence of Q-systems. The Q-systems formalism is a rule-based SLLP (Specialized Language for Linguistic Programming) invented by Alain Colmerauer in 1967 as he was a postdoc coopérant at the TAUM group. He later invented the Prolog language in 1972 after returning to France and becoming a university professor in Marseille-Luminy.

As the engine of the Q-systems is highly non-deterministic, and the manipulated data structures are in some ways too simple, without any types such as string or number, Chandioux encountered limitations in his efforts to raise translation quality and lower computation time to the point he could run it on microcomputers.

In 1981, Chandioux created a new SLLP, or metalanguage for linguistic applications, based on the same basic algorithmic ideas as the Q-systems, but more deterministic, and offering typed labels on tree nodes. Following the advice of Bernard Vauquois and Colmerauer, he created GramR, and developed it for microcomputers.

In 1982, he could start developing in GramR a new system for translating the weather bulletins on a high-end Cromemco microcomputer. METEO 2 went into operation in 1983. The software then ran in 48Kb of central memory with a 5Mb hard disk for paging. METEO 2 was the first MT application to run on a microcomputer.

In 1985, the system had nothing left of the initial prototype, and was officially renamed METEO. It translated about 20 million words per year from English into French, and 10 million words from French into English, with a quality of 97%. Typically, it took 4 minutes for a bulletin in English to be sent from Winnipeg and come back in French after MT and human revision.

In 1996, Chandioux developed a special version of his system (METEO 96) which was used to translate the weather forecasts (different kinds of bulletins) issued by the US National Weather Service during the 1996 Summer Olympics in Atlanta.

The last known version of the system, METEO 5, dates from 1997 and ran on an IBM PC network under Windows NT. It translated 10 pages per second, but was able to fit into a 1.44Mb floppy disk.
