= 1798 Anglo-Omani Treaty =

The 1798 Anglo-Omani Treaty was a bilateral friendship treaty between the British East India Company and Oman signed on 12 October 1798.
