= Pedro Teotónio Pereira =

Portuguese politician and diplomat (1902–1972)

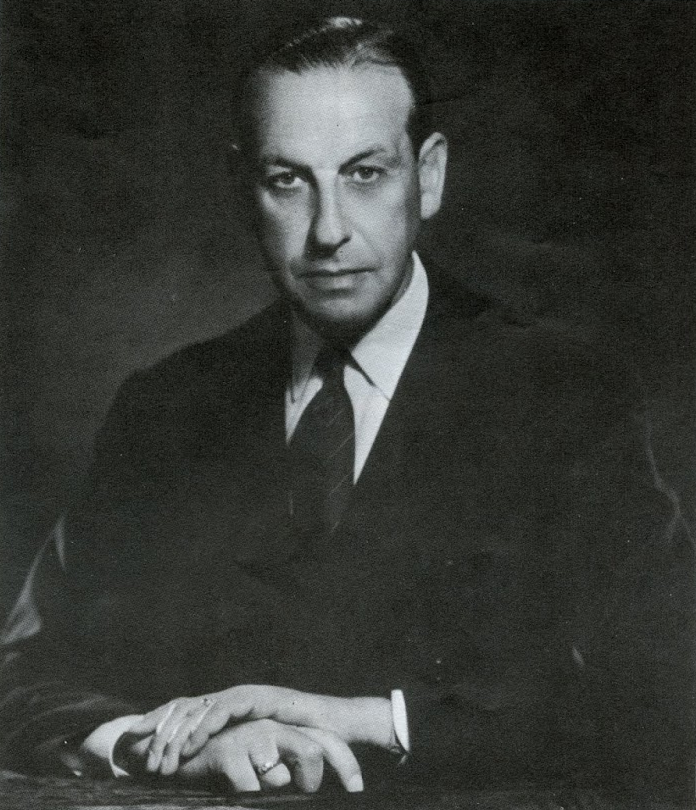
Pedro Teotónio Pereira, 1953

Pedro Teotónio Pereira (7 November 1902 – 14 November 1972) was a Portuguese politician and diplomat. He played a decisive role for the Allies, in drawing Spain with Portugal into a neutral peninsular bloc during World War II.

== Background ==
He was a son of João Teotónio Pereira, Jr. (1869–1948), administrator of the Companhia de Seguros Fidelidade, and wife Virgínia Hermann von Boetischer (1871–1969), paternal grandson of João Teotónio Pereira (1832–1916) and wife Clara Sobral (1840–1910) and maternal grandson of the Prussian Maximilian August Hermann von Boetischer, an engineer, linked to the installation of the telephones in Portugal, and wife Maria José da Silva. His older brother Luís Teotónio Pereira was also a politician.

== Early career ==
Teotónio Pereira, graduated in Mathematics from the University of Lisbon. After graduating, and aiming to follow his family tradition in the insurance business, he pursued postgraduate studies in actuarial science in Switzerland.

In his youth, he was an active member of the Lusitanian Integralism and was very close to António Sardinha.

His expertise in life insurance and actuarial science led Salazar to call on him to reform the Portuguese social security system. At the end of World War I, new legislation on compulsory social insurance had been introduced in Portugal, but due to the lack of scientific studies, the outcome of the First Portuguese Republic's experience was weak. Together with Salazar, Teotónio Pereira launched new legislation and helped establish the foundations of the Portuguese social security system under the Estado Novo.

He was one of the main architects of the corporatist policies of the Portuguese Estado Novo dictatorship. He served as Sub-Secretary of State for Corporations and Social Welfare, reporting directly to Salazar, and enacted extensive legislation that shaped the corporatist structure and laid the foundations of a comprehensive social welfare system. This system was both anti-capitalist and anti-socialist. The corporatisation of the working class was accompanied by strict regulation of business. Workers’ organisations were placed under state control, but were granted a degree of legitimacy they had not previously enjoyed and became beneficiaries of a variety of new social programmes. Nevertheless, even in the regime’s early and optimistic phase, corporatist agencies did not occupy the centre of power, and corporatism was not the true foundation of the entire system.

He also served as Minister of Commerce and Industry from 1936 to 1937.

Unlike Britain, Portugal supported Franco from the outset of the civil war. In January 1938, Teotónio Pereira was appointed by António de Oliveira Salazar as the Portuguese government's Special Agent to Francisco Franco’s administration during the Spanish Civil War, gaining considerable prestige and influence. In April 1938, he officially became the Portuguese Ambassador to Spain, a position he held throughout World War II. His appointment represented the formal diplomatic recognition of Franco's government by Portugal, which occurred while the Spanish Civil War was still in progress.

As part of Salazar’s broader strategy, Teotónio Pereira was tasked with countering both Italian and German influence in Spain during his ambassadorship.

== World War II ==
The prestige and the influence that he gained with the Spanish authorities proved to be of great support to allies during World War II. His role as ambassador during the war has been praised both by scholars and his fellow ambassadors. Scholars have used adjectives like brilliant, shrewd and observant and Samuel Hoare, 1st Viscount Templewood, the British ambassador in Madrid from 1940 to 1944, described in his book "Ambassador on Special Mission" Teotónio Pereira as an ally and a man of "outstanding ability and distinction". Hoare wrote that Teotónio Pereira gave him his help and friendship from the day of Hoare's arrival to Madrid in May 1940. The testimonials from Carlton Hayes and Samuel Hoare would later become very useful to Theotonio Pereira as, while he was placed as ambassador in Brazil, he was unduly accused by the press of having been close to the Nazis.

Among other things, Teotónio Pereira, shared with Salazar a profound attachment to the historic Anglo-Portuguese alliance, and during the war years in Madrid, Teotónio Pereira proved himself a good friend of Britain. Mr. Carlton Hayes, then his American colleague in the diplomatic corps wrote of him in his book, Wartime Mission in Spain: "His strong patriotism was at all times evident as was also his loyalty to the historic Anglo-Portuguese alliance. He recognized, as fully as we did, the danger both to Portugal and to the Allied cause in any Axis intervention in Spain or in any unneutral collaboration of Spain with the Axis. Though he distrusted Serrano Súñer and heartily disliked the Falange, his long and close association with other influential advisers of General Franco and with large segments of the Spanish people stood us, as well as himself, in good stead.... In his constant endeavor to draw Spain with Portugal into a really neutral Peninsular bloc, he contributed immeasurably, at a time when the British and ourselves had much less influence, toward counteracting the propaganda and pleas of our enemies".

Later in the same book, Hayes wrote of a "prodigious number of refugees", who began pouring into Spain in November and December 1942. Most were Frenchmen, half starved, without money or clothes, and Hayes wrote of the decisive intervention of Teotónio Pereira in favour of 16,000 French military refugees who were trying in 1943 to get from Spain to North Africa to join the Allied forces. In that group were also Polish, Dutch and Belgians, most of whom were soldiers or would-be soldiers. According to Hayes, the Poles, in particular, were destined to perform brilliant feats in the later Italian campaign.

In July 1945 he was awarded the Grand Cross of the Spanish Order of Charles III, the most distinguished civil award that can be granted in Spain, restricted to 100 Spanish citizens and very seldom awarded to foreigners.

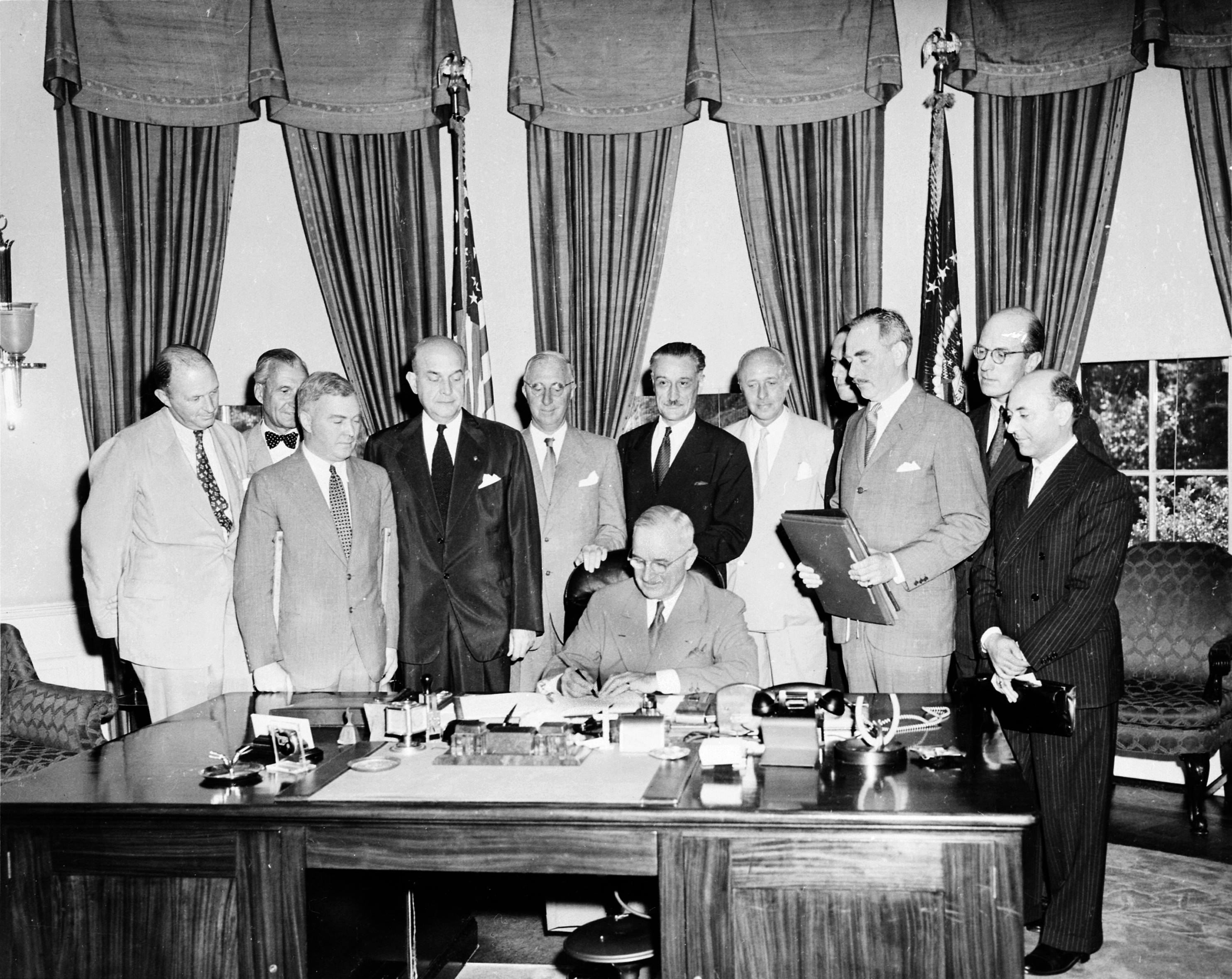
President Truman signing the document implementing the North Atlantic Treaty at his desk in the Oval Office, with Teotonio Pereira standing behind.

He considered himself a "faithful servant of Salazar" and is remembered as one of the main accusers of Aristides de Sousa Mendes. (Note: On June 12, 1940 despite the guarantees that had been given by Franco personally to Teotónio Pereira that even if Italy entered the war, Spain would remain neutral, " Spain took on the status of a nonbelligerent power and invaded Tangiers, further endangering Portuguese neutrality. Then, on June 20, the British embassy in Lisbon sent a letter to the Portuguese Foreign Office that accused Sousa Mendes of "deferring until after office hours all applications for visas" as well as "charging them at a special rate" and requiring at least one refugee "to contribute to a Portuguese charitable fund before the visa was granted". The complaint from the British embassy and the timing of Sousa Mendes's unilateral decision to start issuing visas without following procedures could not have been worse for Salazar and his attempt to preserve Portuguese neutrality. Salazar had instructed the consulates in Spain and those in the south of France, Bordeaux, Bayonne, Perpignan, Marseilles, Nice etc., to facilitate transit visas to British citizens. In addition, Teotónio Pereira also received complaints from the Spanish authorities. He drove from Madrid to the French-Spanish border. The border was chaotic. In Salazar and Pereira's view, Portuguese neutrality was being compromised by Mendes's actions. Pereira later said that Mendes’s behavior implied such confusion coupled with his disheveled appearance that he immediately informed the Spanish authorities that the visas granted by the Bordeaux consulate were null and void and that Mendes had lost the use of his faculties. Two days later, on June 26, 1940, the Spanish Minister Ramón Serrano Suñer told Pereira that Hitler would no longer tolerate the independent existence of an ally of Britain on the Continent and that Spain would soon be forced to permit passage of German troops to invade Portugal. Pereira counteracted with astute diplomatic actions that culminated in an additional protocol to Iberian Pact, signed on 29 July 1940, a key contribution to a neutral Peninsular bloc.)

== Later career ==
He later became Portuguese ambassador in Brazil (1945–47), ambassador in Washington (1947–50), Ambassador to the Court of St. James, London (1953–58) and again in Washington (1961–63).

When Teotónio Pereira was named the Portuguese ambassador to Washington, there were protests from members of the Portuguese-American community, who considered him to be an "extreme nationalist".

As Portugal’s plenipotentiary in Washington he co-signed with President Truman, on 24 August 1949, the document implementing the North Atlantic Treaty.

He was board member of the Calouste Gulbenkian Foundation.

While ambassador in Washington, in 1963, he was diagnosed with Parkinson's disease which forced him to request an early retirement.

When Salazar became unable to govern, the President of the Republic, Américo Thomaz, who had the constitutional competence to choose a replacement, thought that Teotónio Pereira would have been “the most suitable personality to succeed Dr. Salazar, if his health had allowed it", as he wrote in his memoirs.

== Sailing enthusiast and founder of Tall Ships' Races ==
In 1951, while he was ambassador in Washington, Teotónio Pereira invited the Australian Navy official Alan Villiers to get on board of the schooner Argus, a fine cod fishing four-masted schooner, and to record the last commercial activity ever to make use of sails in ocean-crossings. Villiers ended up publishing a book, "The Quest Of The Schooner Argus: A voyage to the Grand Banks and Grenland on a modern four masted fishing schooner". The book was a great success in North America and Europe and was later published in sixteen languages. The Quest of the Schooner Argus made news on the BBC, in the main London newspapers, the National Geographic Magazine, and the New York Times.

In 1953, Teotónio Pereira, together with Bernard Morgan, inspired by the idea of bringing young cadets and seamen under training together from around the world to compete in a friendly competition, organized the first edition of the Tall Ships' Races that took place in 1956 from Torbay – south of England – to Lisbon.

It was also due to the perseverant mediation of Teotónio Pereira that, in 1961, Portugal bought the Sagres the school ship of the Portuguese Navy.

== Marriage and children ==
He married Isabel Maria van Zeller Pereira Palha (Lisbon, Santa Engrácia, 26 October 1903 –), daughter of Constantino Nicolau Pereira Palha and wife and cousin Maria do Patrocínio Pereira Palha van Zeller, of a family of large landowners, and they had three children.

== Published works ==
- Pereira, Pedro Teotonio; Salazar, António de Oliveira (1933). As Ideias do Estado-Novo. Corporações e Previdência Social (in Portuguese). Sub-secretariado de Estado das Corporações e Previdência Social.
- Pereira, Pedro Teotonio (1937). A batalha do futuro organizaçao corporativa (in Portuguese). Livraria Clássica Edit. OCLC 432937259.
- Pereira, Pedro Teotónio (1973). Memórias: postos em que servi e algumas recordações pessoais (in Portuguese). Verbo.
- Pereira, Pedro Teotónio (1987). Correspondência de Pedro Teotónio Pereira Oliveira Salazar (in Portuguese). Presidência do Conselho de Ministros. Comissão do Livro Negro sobre o Regime Fascista.
