= IMDEA =

Spanish research project

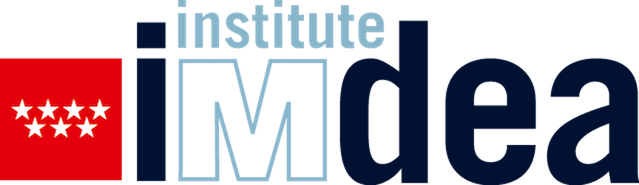
- Founded: 2006
- Purpose: Research
- Location: Madrid, Spain
- Key people: Dra. Irene de Bustamante (); Prof. Ricardo Ramos (); Dr. David Pedro Serrano Granados (IMDEA Energy Institute); Prof. Jon M. Molina-Aldareguía (); Dr. Rodolfo Miranda (IMDEA Nanoscience Institute); Dr. Albert Banchs (Director IMDEA Networks Institute); Dr. Manuel Carro (Director IMDEA Software Institute)
- Website: www.imdea.org

IMDEA (Spanish pronunciation: [inˈde.a]) is a project founded by the Madrid Regional Government, included in the IV Regional Plan of Scientific Research and Technological Innovation 2005-2008 (PRICIT), for the purpose of setting up advanced research centers and higher education and training in the Community of Madrid. Between 2006 and 2008 the project created nine IMDEA Institutes of which two (Mathematics and Social Sciences) were closed.

== Organization ==
Each of the IMDEA Institutes is managed by an independent foundation. There are currently seven, each specializing in an area of knowledge, as indicated by their names:

- IMDEA Water Institute combines knowledge from experimental, legal and social sciences as well as engineering, to address a variety of water management concerns in the 21st century. Its research includes scientific and social aspects of water, including supply and demand; quality and quantity; physical, chemical and biological characteristics; time and space variability; watershed processes; and economic, ecological, and equity considerations.
- IMDEA Food Institute was initially set up to undertake research in food-related areas, such as nutrition and health, or food quality and safety. By agreement from the Scientific Council, it has increasingly focused research on Nutritional Genomics. In June 2025, it changed its name to IMDEA Nutrition Institute.
- IMDEA Energy Institute was created to promote and undertake research and development in energy-related areas, principally renewable energy and clean energy technologies, with the aim of developing a sustainable energy system with little or no environmental impact.
- IMDEA Materials Institute brings together researchers from around the world to Madrid to conduct research in Materials Science and Engineering. The institute also focuses on technology transfer to the industrial sector in order to increase business competitiveness.
- IMDEA Nanoscience Institute, created jointly by the Community of Madrid and the Spanish Ministry of Education and Science, organizes research groups of scientists, both local and international, to advance Nanoscience and Nanotechnology. The Institute also provides scientific and technical training, and promotes technology transfer and the creation of businesses in Madrid and Spain.
- IMDEA Networks Institute's researchers study the emergent properties of today's communication networks in order to be able to improve the algorithms and protocols that allow these networks to operate. They create mathematical models and validate theories through simulations and measurements in test beds and/or real-world deployments.
- IMDEA Software Institute devises rigorous methods that allow cost-effective development of practical software products with high-quality, sophisticated functionality, i.e., safe, reliable, and efficient. The focus of the Institute includes all phases of the software development cycle (analysis, design, implementation, validation and verification), as well as methods, languages, and tools.

Each of the Institutes is governed and administered by a Board of Trustees, who may be appointed or elected, and who choose a Director. Some of the trustees are well-known scientists, and others are experts in areas related to the foundations' goals, working at universities and other research centers on the Board. Trustees with business experience or recognized professional prestige in the sectors related to the foundations' goals may also be appointed.

Each institute also has a Scientific Council, or Scientific Advisory Board, composed of researchers in the areas related to each Institute's goals. These scientists advise the Director in the development of the annual action plan and the four-year plan of objectives; evaluating the results of both of these plans; advising the Council on all scientific work submitted for its approval; and making proposals to the Council for the renewal and appointment of trustees.

== Closures ==
- IMDEA Mathematics and IMDEA Social sciences did not succeed in achieving the required expectations, in particular in respect to social impact and technology transfer, and were discontinued shortly after their creation.
