= Veronica Dahl =

Canadian computer scientist

Verónica Dahl
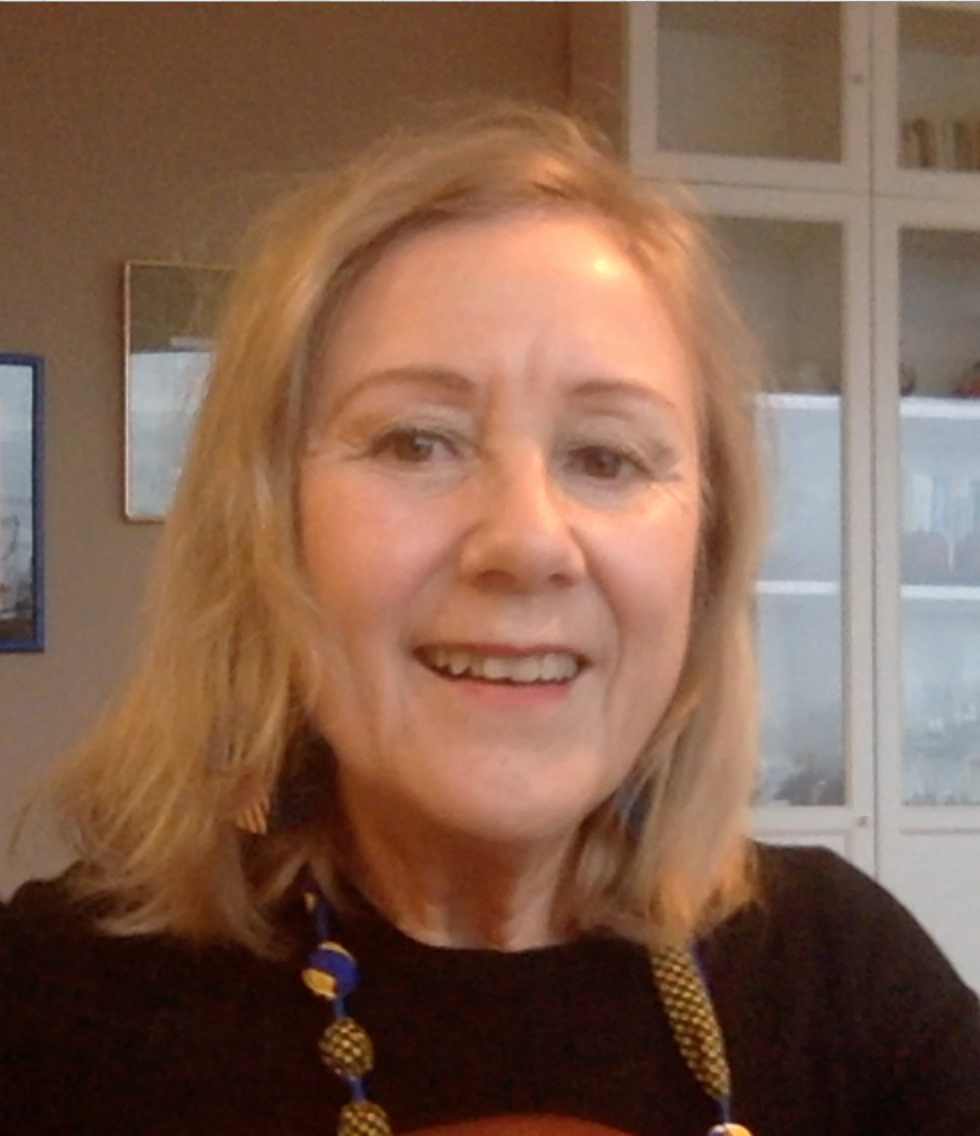
- Born: Argentina
- Citizenship: Argentine/Canadian
- Education: Universidad de Buenos Aires; University of Aix-Marseille II
- Known for: Logic programming
- Awards: Co-Founder of Logic Programming (ALP 1997)
- Scientific career
- Fields: Computer science Bioinformatics; Cognitive science
- Workplaces: Simon Fraser University
- Thesis: Un système déductif d’interrogation de banques de données en espagnol (1977)
- Doctoral advisor: Alain Colmerauer

Verónica Dahl is an Argentine/Canadian computer scientist. She is recognized as one of the 15 founders of the field of logic programming. She currently leads the Prolog Education Group 2.0.

== Early life ==
Dahl attended college at Buenos Aires University, and graduated with a degree in computer science in 1974. As the political conflict in Argentina increased, Dahl attended graduate school in France. In 1977, she was the first graduate at the Université d'Aix-Marseille to receive a doctorate in Artificial Intelligence.

== Career ==
While involved in the research for her doctorate, Dahl became a pioneer in the field of logic programming, developing both the first logic programmed database system, and an (also logic-programmed) front end to consult it in a human language (Spanish). Dahl's research and methodologies became multi-disciplinary, and included Computational Linguistics, Computational Molecular Biology, and Artificial Intelligence. She became an associate professor at Simon Fraser University in 1982, and became a full professor there in 1991. In 1996 she was honored by the Logic Programming Association as one of the 15 founders of the Logic Programming Field, and has extensively pioneered as well the areas of Logic Grammars and Constraint Handling Rules.

Dahl is a woman pioneer in a male-dominated field. She fought gender inequality while she was a professor at Simon Fraser University, both through mentoring and role modelling, and through concrete actions. After Simon Fraser University refused to reimburse her $17 for childcare expenses while she was delivering a guest speech in Victoria, where she’d traveled with her nursing baby, she went first to her department and then Natural Sciences and Engineering Research Council of Canada (NSERC) with her protest, which ended with the NSERC changing their policy to make childcare a covered expense for nursing researchers they funded. She proposed and actively promoted the provision of childcare at logic programming conferences, until it was adopted formally into their constitution, and is now routinely offered as a result. She also obtained a change in SFU's legislation when it resulted in her graduate student being timed out for delays caused by life-threatening medical conditions upon birthing twins.

She has developed numerous international research projects and collaborations, most notably with Denmark, Spain, Portugal, Germany and France, and worked with IBM, Vancouver Software Labs, International Artificial Intelligence, as well as in her own company, Regenerative AI. In her work with IBM, she obtained a record-breaking research contract. She served as president of the Association of Logic Programming from 2001-2005. She was awarded the prestigious Marie Curie Chair of Excellence 2008-2011 from the European Commission for her pioneering work on Constraint Solving and Language Processing for Bioinformatics. In 2012 she quit her Full Professor position at Simon Fraser University in order to focus on research. SFU awarded her Lifetime Professor Emeritus status as from 2013. Her research program continues under NSERC funding, and she serves at the Scientific Advisory Board of IMDEA Software, as well as leading PEG 2.0. She balances her scientific activities with artistic ones, as a student of music, theatre and dance, and performs regularly as singer and guitarist in Vancouver.

== Research ==
Dahl's research is focused on "bridging the gap between the formal and the humanistic sciences, and to achieve more human-like communication with computers for a more humane, less dichotomized world". As such it is multi-faceted, but always pivoting around the main incarnations of inferential programming that she helped pioneer: Logic programming, Constraint- based Programming, and Logic Grammars. She also incorporated non-classical reasoning capabilities into Prolog, Hyprolog and CHRG. Dahl's research has had theoretical and practical impact in logic, linguistics, computational intelligence, internet programming, virtual worlds and molecular biology.

Her work on discovering signature oligos, which resulted in software being used daily at Agriculture and Agri-Food Canada, has also been used to complete the validation of an array for all Phytophthora species, with high impact for forestry (as one of the species is the causal agent of the sudden oak death which is devastating California), for marine sciences (it has been used to monitor biodiversity in Hawaïian coral reefs), for entomology (for characterizing biting flies) and for detecting fraudulent fish sales. Her present research focuses on grammar induction for under-resourced languages and other solidarity vs. domination-promoting uses of AI, e.g. programming our way out of social and ecological catastrophes; making logical reasoning and trustworthy coding skills more universally available.

=== Most Significant Scholarly Publications ===
1. Language-proficient Knowledge Bases and the World Wide Web
2. Intelligent methodologies for Life Sciences, in particular Molecular Biology
3. Properties as constraints—from parsing to cognitive modeling
4. Integrating high level methodologies into a new language: HYPROLOG

== Honors and awards ==
Dahl has received many honors and awards in her career. In 1994, Dahl received the Calouste Gulbenkian Award for Science and Technology. In 1997, she was named as one of the founding members in logic programming by the Association for Logic Programming. In 2009, she received the Best Paper Award at the Third International Work-Conference on the Interplay between Natural and Artificial Computation (2009).

== Books ==
- (1989) Abramson, H. & Dahl, V. Logic Grammars. Springer.

== Literary works ==
=== Prose ===
- (1999) Love to Hide, Love to Invent. First Prize in the Prose Category, Cecilia Lamont Literary Contest.
- (2000) Detour. First Prize, Crime55 literary contest.
- (2000) A Case of Possession. First Prize in the Prose Category, Cecilia Lamont Literary Contest.

=== Poetry ===
- (2000) Wholeness. Finalist of the 11th Annual Poetry contest, Hope Writers Guild.
- (2000) Life Tides. Finalist of the Millenium 2000 Poetry contest.

== See also ==
- Logic programming
- Timeline of women in science
