= Iberian Pact =

1939 pact between Spain and Portugal

Portuguese–Spanish Treaty of Friendship and Non-Aggression
- Type: Non-Aggression Pact
- Signed: 17 March 1939; 87 years ago
- Location: Lisbon, Portugal
- Expiration: 2 November 1977; 48 years ago
- Signatories: Nicolás Franco; António de Oliveira Salazar
- Parties: Francoist Spain; Estado Novo (Portugal)
- Languages: Spanish; Portuguese

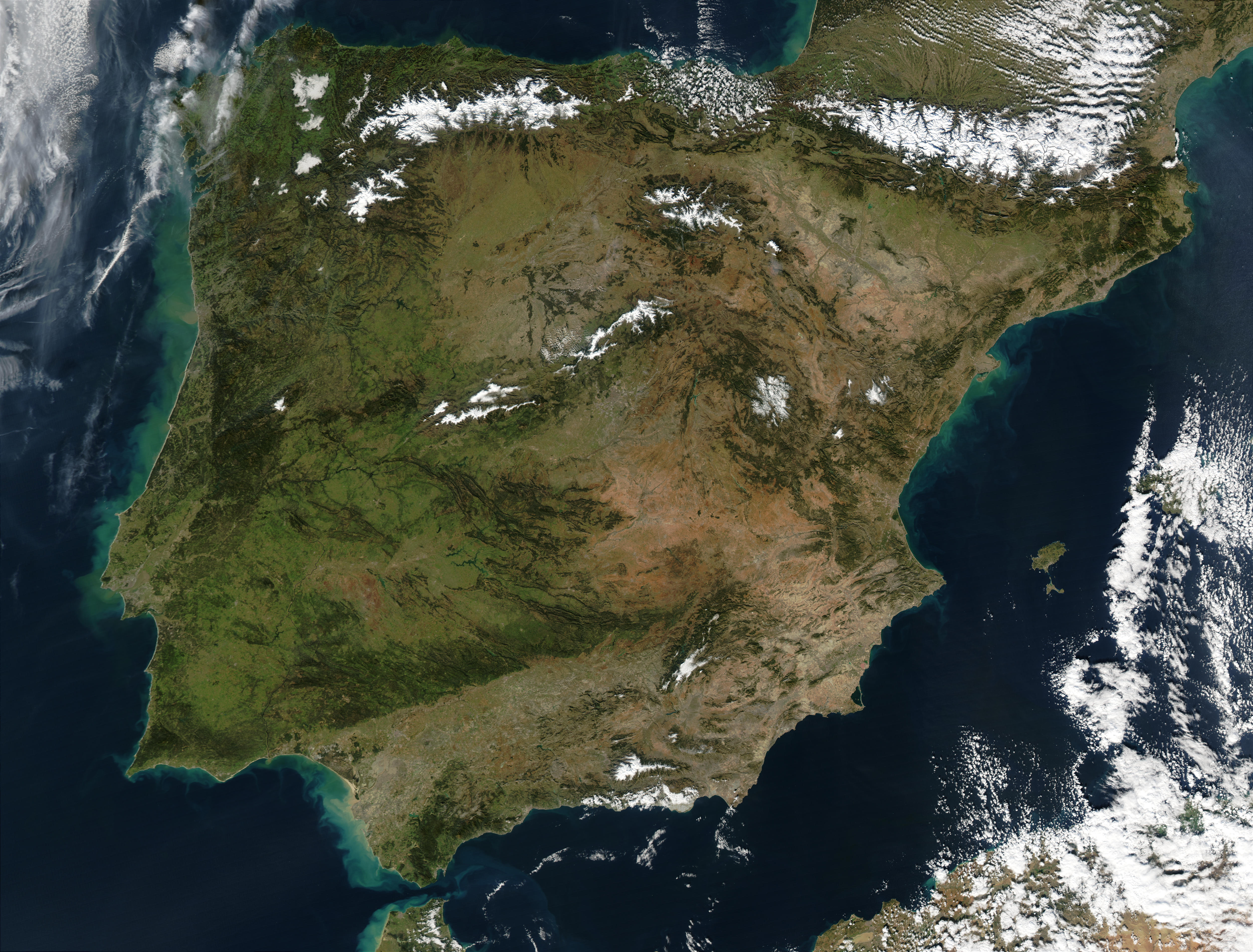

The Iberian Pact (Pacto Ibérico) or Peninsular Pact, formally the Portuguese–Spanish Treaty of Friendship and Non-Aggression, (Note: Spanish: Tratado de Amistad y No Agresión entre Portugal y España; Portuguese: Tratado de Amizade e Não Agressão entre Portugal e Espanha) was a non-aggression pact that was signed at Lisbon, just a few days before the end of the Spanish Civil War, on 17 March 1939 by Portuguese Prime Minister António de Oliveira Salazar, representing Portugal, and Ambassador Nicolás Franco, representing Spain. The treaty was ratified on 25 March 1939.

The Iberian Pact marked the beginning of a new phase in Iberian relations, and regular meetings between Franco and Salazar played a fundamental role in the new political arrangement. The pact proved to be a decisive instrument in keeping the Iberian Peninsula out of Hitler's continental system. An additional protocol to the pact was signed on 29 July 1940, after the Fall of France.

== Background ==
The treaty was conceived in the final months of the Spanish Civil War. Portugal had provided support for the rebel Nationalist government of Burgos throughout the war, provided diplomatic support in the League of Nations and allowed 8,000 to 12,000 volunteers from Portugal to join the rebel army. Portuguese Prime Minister António de Oliveira Salazar saw Francisco Franco as a kindred spirit, with both leaders being autocratic and against the socialist Republican Spain. Salazar also sought to make his country less reliant on the United Kingdom and so the Iberian Pact was one of many treaties signed between Portugal and foreign powers, including Nazi Germany and Fascist Italy, as a means of expanding Portuguese influence. Finally, Portugal was concerned with ambitions of Spain, whether Republican or Nationalist, to attack Portugal or the British-held Gibraltar.

Spain was motivated with its desire to remain neutral in what it saw was an inevitable future war between the United Kingdom and Germany, and it hoped that a treaty would detach Portugal from British influence. Spain was willing to expel its foreign volunteers to guarantee that neutrality.

On 16 September 1938, in the background of the Munich Crisis, Francoist Spain asked if Portugal would be willing to negotiate a treaty of reciprocal security. On the 19th, a non-aggression pact proposal was proposed, and on the 28th, a draft treaty was handed by Ambassador Nicolás Franco to the Portuguese government. After the end of the Catalonia Offensive, Salazar asked Luís Teixeira de Sampaio to write a broader and balanced draft treaty, which was proposed to the Spanish ambassador on 9 February 1939. That version became the treaty.

== Articles ==
- Article 1 stated that the parties would respect each other's borders and territories and not conduct acts of aggression against each other.
- Article 2 stated that the parties would not assist aggressors acting against each other.
- Article 3 stated that the parties would not enter pacts or alliances with other powers threatening each other.
- Article 4 stated that if a party entered a pact or alliance with another power, the treaty would remain in force.
- Article 5 set the treaty duration at ten years and outlined a process for extension at ten-year intervals.
- Article 6 stated that the treaty would not enter force until an exchange of ratifications had taken place.

== Aftermath ==
The Iberian Pact declared mutual respect for borders and territories and declared that assistance would be denied to aggressors to the signatory nations. The pact did not call into question previous alliances, such as the Anglo-Portuguese Alliance, and established that future pacts or alliance would safeguard Iberian interests and neutrality in the event of a general European war. The pact was originally planned to last ten years, but Article 5 provided for extensions for additional ten-year periods.

The pact was stressed when Spain, abandoning neutrality previously promised to Portugal, took on the status of a non-belligerent power and invaded the Tangier International Zone. Following this and the Fall of France, an additional protocol to the pact was signed on 29 July 1940, which reinforced the neutrality aspects of the treaty and required consultations and synchronisation of strategies to ensure common interests were protected. In December 1942, as the outcome of the war seemed to have turned to favour the Allies, Spanish Foreign Minister Francisco Gómez-Jordana Sousa announced the Iberian Bloc, seeking to maintain the neutrality of Spain and Portugal. Throughout the Second World War, the pact was a significant factor in allowing Spain to withstand pressure from Germany and Italy to join the Axis powers, and it allowed Portugal more freedom with regard to its alliance with Britain.

On 20 September 1948, after negotiations between Nicolás Franco and José Caeiro da Mata the pact was renewed and expanded in a move that was seen as a victory for Spanish diplomacy as it showed that Spain was not alone in the postwar era, and that Portuguese membership in NATO, which was then being negotiated, did not render the pact moot.

In 1958, the pact was expanded into a mutual defence treaty.

The pact was expanded and renewed in 1970. In March 1975, after the Carnation Revolution in Portugal, António de Spínola attempted to invoke the pact to demand Spanish intervention. This was rejected by Franco.

The Iberian Pact was replaced in 1977 by the Treaty of Friendship and Cooperation between Spain and Portugal after both countries had transitioned into democracies.

== See also ==
- Portugal in World War II
- Spain in World War II
- Pedro Teotónio Pereira
- Portugal–Spain relations

== Sources ==
- Hayes, Carlton J.H. (1945). Wartime mission in Spain, 1942–1945. Macmillan Company 1st Edition. ISBN 978-1121497245.
- Hoare, Samuel (1946). Ambassador on Special Mission. Collins; First Edition. pp. 124, 125.
- Kay, Hugh (1970). Salazar and Modern Portugal. New York: Hawthorn Books.
