= Brunei–United States Treaty of Peace, Friendship, Commerce and Navigation =

1850 treaty between Brunei and the United States

The United States of America and Brunei signed The Treaty of Peace, Friendship, Commerce and Navigation on June 23, 1850. This treaty outlined the relationship of the United States and Brunei and is still in place today. It was ratified by Millard Fillmore on January 31, 1853 and proclaimed by President Franklin Pierce on July 12, 1854. The relations between the USA and Brunei began on the U.S.S. Constitution's trip around the world, and that ship's visit to Brunei on April 6, 1845. Both countries celebrated the 161st anniversary of the signing of this treaty when the new US Embassy opened in Bandar Seri Begawan in 2011.

== Text of the Treaty ==
His Highness Omar Ali Saifeddin ebn Marhoum Sultan Mahomed Jamalil Alam and Pangiran Anak Mumin to whom belong the Government of the Country of Brunei and all its provinces and dependencies, for themselves and their descendants, on the one part, and the United States of America, on the other, have agreed to cement the friendship which has happily existed between them, by a Convention containing the following Articles.

ARTICLE I

Peace, friendship, and good understanding shall from henceforward and for ever subsist between the United States of America and His Highness Omar Ali Saifeddin, Sultan of Brunei and their respective successors and Citizens and Subjects.

ARTICLE II

The Citizens of the United States of America shall have full liberty to enter into, reside in, trade with, and pass with their merchandize through all parts of the dominions of His Highness the Sultan of Brunei, and they shall enjoy therein all the privileges and advantages with respect to commerce or otherwise, which are now or which may hereafter be granted to the Citizens or Subjects of the most favored nation: and the subjects of His Highness the Sultan of Brunei, shall in like manner be at liberty to enter into, reside in, trade with, and pass through with their merchandize through all Parts of the United States of America, as freely as the citizens and subjects of the most favored nation, and they shall enjoy in the United States of America all the privileges and advantages with respect to commerce, or otherwise, which are now or which may hereafter be granted therein to the Citizens or Subjects of the most favored nation.

ARTICLE III

Citizens of the United States shall be permitted to purchase rent or occupy, or in any other legal way to acquire all kinds of property within the Dominions of His Highness the Sultan of Brunei: and His Highness engages that such Citizens of the United States of America shall, as far as lies in his power, within his dominions enjoy full and complete protection and security for themselves and for any property which they may so acquire in future, or which they may have acquired already, before the date of the present convention.

ARTICLE IV

No Article whatever shall be prohibited from being imported into or exported from the territories of His Highness the Sultan of Brunei; but the trade between the United States of America and the dominions of His Highness the Sultan of Brunei, shall be perfectly free and shall be subject only to the custom duties which may hereafter be in force in regard to such trade.

ARTICLE V

No duty exceeding one dollar per registered ton shall be levied on American Vessels entering the ports of his Highness the Sultan of Brunei and this fixed duty of one dollar per ton to be levied on all American vessels shall be in lieu of all other charges or duties whatsoever. His Highness moreover engages that American trade and American goods shall be exempt from any internal duties and also from any injurious regulations which may hereafter, from whatever causes, be adopted in the dominions of the Sultan of Borneo.

ARTICLE VI

His Highness the Sultan of Brunei agrees that no duty whatever shall be levied on the exportation from His Highness dominions of any article, the growth, produce, or manufacture of those dominions.

ARTICLE VII

His Highness the Sultan of Brunei engages to permit the Ships of War of the United States of America freely to enter the Ports, river and creeks, situate within his dominions and to allow such ships to provide themselves at a fair and moderate price, with such supplies, stores and provisions as they may from time to time stand in need of.

ARTICLE VIII

If any vessel under the American flag should be wrecked on the coast of the dominions of His Highness the Sultan of Brunei, His Highness engages to give all the assistance in his power to recover for, and to deliver over to, the owners thereof, all the property that can be saved from such vessels. His Highness further engages to extend to the officers and crew and to all other persons on board of such wrecked vessels, full protection both as to their persons and as to their property.

ARTICLE IX

His Highness the Sultan of Brunei, agrees that in all cases where a citizen of the United States shall be accused of any crime committed in any part of His Highness’ dominions the person so accused shall be exclusively tried and adjudged by the American Consul, or other officer duly appointed for that purpose, and in all cases where disputes or differences may arise between American Citizens, or between American Citizens and the subjects of His Highness or between American Citizens and the Citizens or subjects of any other foreign power, in the dominions of the Sultan of Borneo, the American Consul or other duly appointed officer shall have power to hear and decide the same without any interference, molestation or hindrance, on the part of any authority of Borneo, either before during or after the litigation.

This Treaty shall be ratified and the ratifications thereof shall be exchanged at Brunei within two years after this date.

Done at the City of Brunei, on this twenty third day of June Anno Domini one thousand eight hundred and fifty and on the thirteenth day of the month Saaban of the year of the Hijrah one thousand two hundred and sixty six.

JOSEPH BALESTIER

(SEAL OF THE SULTAN)
