= IMDEA Nanoscience Institute =

Spanish non-profit foundation

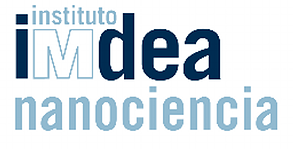

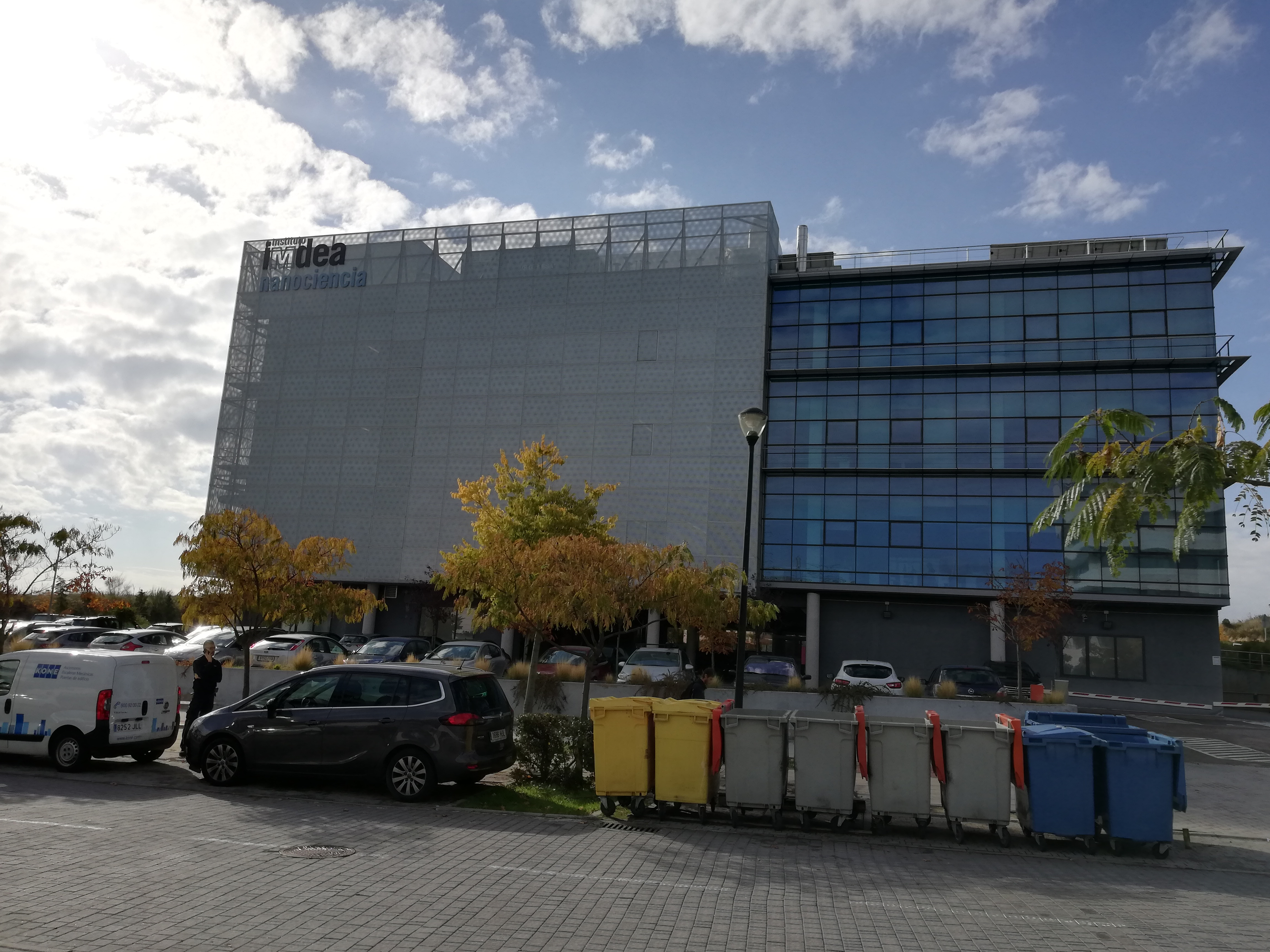
- Founded: 2006-2007
- Purpose: Research
- Location: Cantoblanco, Madrid, Spain
- Key people: Dr Rodolfo Miranda
- Website: www.nanoscience.imdea.org

IMDEA Nanoscience Institute is a private non-profit foundation within the IMDEA Institutes network, created in 2006-2007 as a result of collaboration agreement between the Community of Madrid and Spanish Ministry of Education and Science. The foundation manages IMDEA-Nanoscience Institute, a scientific centre dedicated to front-line research in nanoscience, nanotechnology and molecular design and aiming at transferable innovations and close contact with industries. IMDEA Nanoscience is a member of the Campus of International excellence, a consortium of research institutes promoted by the Autonomous University of Madrid and Spanish National Research Council (UAM/CSIC).

== Organization ==
The foundation is governed by the board of trustees, consisting of the representatives of the Institute Administration, involved universities, regional government, scientific experts and industrial collaborators. Scientific Advisory Committee consists of the leading experts in the field of nanoscience. From February 2007 Dr Rodolfo Miranda is the director of the Institute.

== Research ==
Research at IMDEA Nanoscience is concentrated on developments in nanoscience and nanotechnology, combining the efforts of specialists in condensed matter physics, chemistry, computer modelling, spectroscopy, microscopy, surface sciences, molecular biology. One of the aims of the institute is to attract international scientists on a competitive basis, as well as raising new generations of Spanish scientists. More than 50 international and regional projects are run in parallel, including work on polymer solar cells, OLED, biosensors, lasers, drug delivery, bioimaging, etc., in 7 scientific programs:

- Molecular nanoscience;
- Scanning probe microscopies and surfaces;
- Nanomagnetism;
- Nanobiosystems: biomachines and manipulation of macromolecules;
- Nanoelectronics and superconductivity;
- Nanosurfaces and nanodevices;
- Nanomedicine.

== See also ==
- IMDEA
