= Luís Teotónio Pereira =

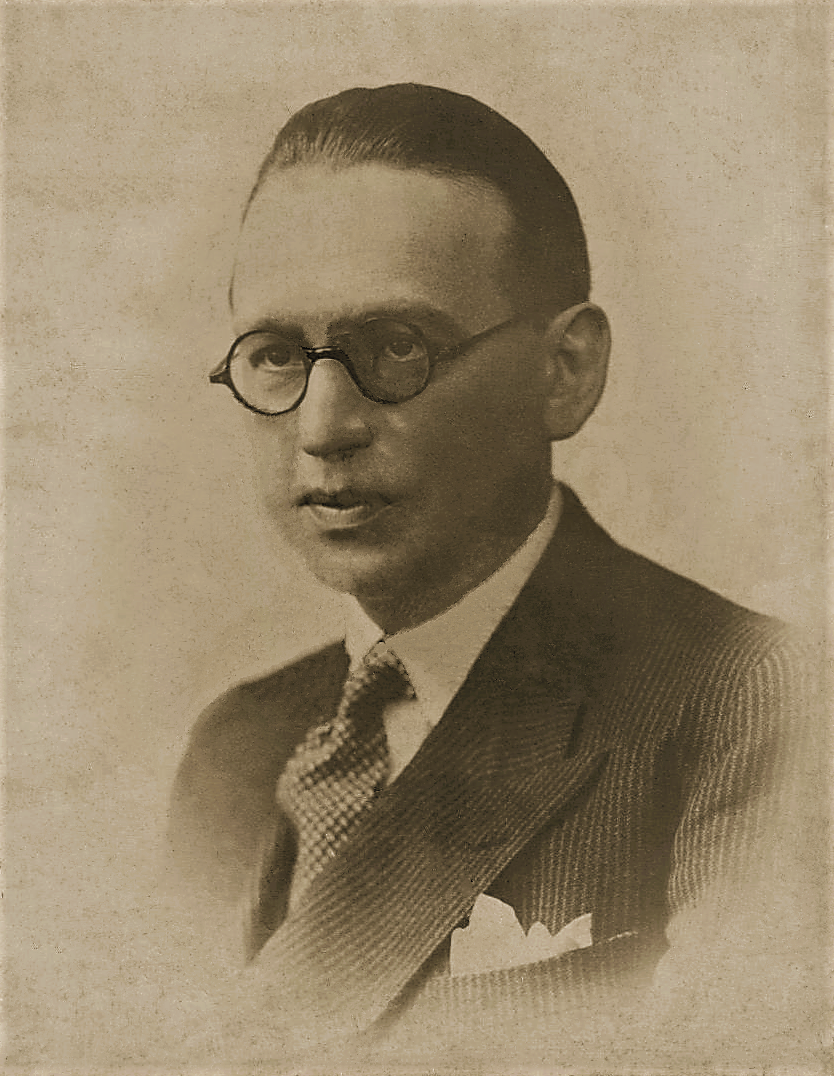
- Teotónio Pereira, c. 1930s

Mayor of Almada
- In office 1942–1946
- Preceded by: João Baptista Pais Pinto
- Succeeded by: Luís Arriaga de Sá Linhares

Personal details
- Born: 17 March 1895
- Died: February 13, 1990 (aged 94)
- Party: National Union

Luís Teotónio Pereira (17 March 1895 – 13 February 1990) was a Portuguese politician and diplomat. He was born in Lisbon, Sagrado Coração de Jesus.

== Early life ==
Luís's father was João Teotónio Pereira, Jr. (Lisbon, 1869 - Lisbon, São Domingos de Benfica, 1948), Administrator of the Companhia de Seguros Fidelidade, and his mother Virgínia Hermann von Boetischer (Lisbon, Santa Engrácia, 1871 - Lisbon, 1969). Their children were Luis' younger brother, Pedro Teotónio Pereira, also a Politician and a Diplomat. His maternal grandfather was the Prussian Maximilian August Hermann von Boetischer, an Engineer who is linked to the installation of the telephones in Portugal.

== Career ==
He was a Deputy to the Assembleia Nacional, a Procurator to the Corporative Chamber and a Mayor of the Municipal Chamber of Almada during the Estado Novo and the government of António de Oliveira Salazar, like his father Administrator of the Companhia de Seguros Fidelidade, President of the Grémio de Exportadores de Vinhos e dos Exportadores de Azeite, Grand Officer of the Order of the Industrial Merit.

== Personal life ==
He married Alice de Azevedo Gomes de Bettencourt (Angra do Heroísmo, Sé Catedral, 31 December 1895 – Lisbon, Lapa, 11 June 1957) at the Estrela Basilica in Lisbon on 17 December 1919. They had six children. Pereira also qualified on a Course of Painting (Watercolor painting) with Alfredo Roque Gameiro, daughter of Severiano de Bettencourt and wife Maria Adelaide de Ávila Gomes.
