= Gustavo Alonso =

Spanish electrical engineer and computer scientist

Gustavo Alonso is a Spanish/Swiss researcher in the areas of Computer Science and Electrical Engineering. He is a full professor at the Department of Computer Science and associated with the Department of Information Technology and Electrical Engineering of ETH Zürich. He is the head of the Institute of Computing Platforms (Systems Group), an ACM Fellow, and IEEE Fellow, winner of the Lifetime Achievements Award of EuroSys, and distinguished alumnus of the Department of Computer Science of UC Santa Barbara.

== Career ==
Gustavo Alonso was born in Madrid, Spain where he studied Telecommunications (Electrical and Computer Engineering) at the Technical University of Madrid (Universidad Politécnica de Madrid, UPM) in the Escuela Técnica Superior de Ingenieros de Telecomunicación (ETSIT). During his studies, he completed a summer internship at Hewlett-Packard in the Optoelectronic Division sited in San Jose, California, USA. After obtaining his degree in Spain, and as a Fulbright scholar, he continued his studies at the Department of Computer Science of the UC Santa Barbara where he obtained a M.S. and a Ph.D. degree under the supervision of Amr El Abbadi and Divyakant Agrawal.

After graduating from UC Santa Barbara, he worked at the IBM Almaden Research Center in San Jose California together with C. Mohan researching on workflow management as part of the FlowMark project and on MQ-Series, a distributed message passing system now part of the IBM MQ product series.

Gustavo joined ETH Zurich as a senior researcher in the Institute of Information Systems, working on a variety of topics ranging from transactional concurrency control to workflow management. He was appointed Assistant Professor of the same Institute in 1998 and promoted to Full Professor in 2001. Later he moved to the Institute of Pervasive Computing and he is now the head of the Institute of Computing Platforms and a member of the Systems Group, which he founded together with other faculty.
