= Iberian summits =

The Hispano–Portuguese Summits or simply Iberian Summits (Spanish: cumbres ibéricas; Portuguese: cimeiras ibéricas) are formal meetings conducted by the Government of Portugal and the Government of Spain to discuss issues of mutual concern. The first one was held in November 1983 in Sintra, Portugal. They are chaired by the respective heads of government. In the 2001 summit, both parts agreed to hold additional meetings between the foreign ministers in-between-summits in order to prepare the next Iberian summit in line. Since 2004 presidents of Spanish border regions (Castile and León, Galicia, Extremadura and Andalusia) may also attend to the summits.

Ian Cooper and Federico Fabbrini (2022) have mapped this bilateral summit between prime ministers as an instance of "bottom-up regional group within the European Union".

== List of Iberian summits ==
Summit	Date	Location	Prime ministers (host & guest)
1st Summit	November 1983	Sintra, Portugal	Mário Soares & Felipe González
2nd Summit	May 1985	Alcántara, Spain	Felipe González & Mário Soares
3rd Summit	October 1986	Guimarães, Portugal	Aníbal Cavaco Silva & Felipe González
4th Summit	November 1987	Madrid, Spain	Felipe González & Aníbal Cavaco Silva
5th Summit	November 1988	Lisbon, Portugal	Aníbal Cavaco Silva & Felipe González
6th Summit	February 1990	Carmona, Spain	Felipe González & Aníbal Cavaco Silva
7th Summit	December 1990	Quinta do Lago, Portugal	Aníbal Cavaco Silva & Felipe González
8th Summit	December 1991	Trujillo, Spain	Felipe González & Aníbal Cavaco Silva
9th Summit	December 1992	Funchal, Portugal	Aníbal Cavaco Silva & Felipe González
10th Summit	December 1993	Palma de Mallorca, Spain	Felipe González & Aníbal Cavaco Silva
11th Summit	November 1994	Porto, Portugal	Aníbal Cavaco Silva & Felipe González
12th Summit	January 1996	Madrid, Spain	Felipe González & António Guterres
13th Summit	October 1996	Ponta Delgada, Portugal	António Guterres & José María Aznar
14th Summit	November 1997	Madrid, Spain	José María Aznar & António Guterres
15th Summit	November 1998	Vilamoura, Portugal	António Guterres & José María Aznar
16th Summit	January 2000	Salamanca, Spain	José María Aznar & António Guterres
17th Summit	January 2001	Sintra, Portugal	António Guterres & José María Aznar
18th Summit	October 2002	Valencia, Spain	José María Aznar & José Manuel Durão Barroso
19th Summit	November 2003	Figueira da Foz, Portugal	José Manuel Durão Barroso & José María Aznar
20th Summit	October 2004	Santiago de Compostela, Spain	José Luis Rodríguez Zapatero & Pedro Santana Lopes
21st Summit	November 2005	Évora, Portugal	José Sócrates & José Luis Rodríguez Zapatero
22nd Summit	November 2006	Badajoz, Spain	José Luis Rodríguez Zapatero & José Sócrates
23rd Summit	January 2008	Braga, Portugal	José Sócrates & José Luis Rodríguez Zapatero
24th Summit	January 2009	Zamora, Spain	José Luis Rodríguez Zapatero & José Sócrates
25th Summit	May 2012	Porto, Portugal	Pedro Passos Coelho & Mariano Rajoy.
26th Summit	May 2013	Madrid, Spain	Mariano Rajoy & Pedro Passos Coelho
27th Summit	June 2014	Vidago, Portugal	Pedro Passos Coelho & Mariano Rajoy
28th Summit	June 2015	Baiona, Spain	Mariano Rajoy & Pedro Passos Coelho
29th Summit	May 2017	Vila Real, Portugal	António Costa & Mariano Rajoy
30th Summit	November 2018	Valladolid, Spain	Pedro Sánchez & António Costa
31st Summit	October 2020	Guarda, Portugal	António Costa & Pedro Sánchez
32nd Summit	October 2021	Trujillo, Spain	Pedro Sánchez & António Costa
33rd Summit	November 2022	Viana do Castelo, Portugal	António Costa & Pedro Sánchez
34th Summit	March 2023	Lanzarote, Spain	Pedro Sánchez & António Costa
35th Summit	November 2024	Faro, Portugal	Luís Montenegro & Pedro Sánchez
