= Treaty of Friendship and Cooperation between Spain and Portugal =

1977 treaty between Spain and Portugal

- Type: Bilateral treaty
- Signed: November 2, 1977
- Location: Madrid, Spain
- Effective: May 5, 1978
- Signatories: Mário Soares; Adolfo Suárez
- Parties: Spain; Portugal
- Languages: Spanish; Portuguese

The Treaty of Friendship and Cooperation between Spain and Portugal (Spanish: Tratado de Amistad y Cooperación entre España y Portugal, Portuguese: Tratado de Amizade e Cooperação entre Portugal e Espanha) is a bilateral treaty of friendship signed between Spain and Portugal on 22 November 1977. It was ratified on 17 April 1978 in Portugal and on 25 April 1978 in Spain. Its stated goals were to strengthen the bonds of friendship and solidarity between the two countries. It was signed by Portuguese Prime Minister Mário Soares and Spanish Prime Minister Adolfo Suárez.

The treaty replaced the Iberian Pact signed in 1939, and followed both countries' transitions into democracies, after the Carnation Revolution in Portugal and the 1977 Spanish general election.

== See also ==
- Portugal–Spain relations
