= Luís Moniz Pereira =

Luís Moniz Pereira (born in 1947 in Lisbon, Portugal) is Professor of Computer Science and Director of the AI centre at New University of Lisbon. His research is in the field of logic programming and in knowledge representation, reasoning and cognitive science more generally.

He was the founding president of the Portuguese AI association, and has been a founding member of the editorial boards of the journals of Logic Programming, Automated Reasoning, New Generation Computing, Theory and Practice of Logic Programming, Universal Computer Science, Applied Logic, Electronic Transactions on AI, and of the Computational Logic Newsletter. He is also advisory editor of the International Journal of Reasoning-Based Intelligent Systems and Associate Editor for Artificial Intelligence of the ACM Computing Surveys.

He was awarded the Doctor honoris causa by the Technical University of Dresden in 2006, and became an ECCAI Fellow in 2001. He coordinates the Erasmus Mundus European MSc in Computational Logic at UNL, is vice-president of EASE, the European Association for semantic Web Education, and belongs to the board of trustees and to the Scientific Advisory Board of the IMDEA Software Institute.
