= Jacques Cohen (computer scientist) =

Professor emeritus of computer science

Jacques Cohen is a professor emeritus of computer science and of the Volen National Center for Complex Systems at Brandeis University. There he served as the TJX/Feldberg Chair in Computer Science. He has performed research in algorithms, parsing and compiling, memory management, logic and constraint logic programming, and parallelism. Cohen has published extensively, frequently with undergraduate and graduate students.

Pioneering many aspects of modern computer science, Cohen's work includes experimentation, education, and research, directed and carried out at many institutions of higher learning, including Brandeis University, Brown University, MIT, Wellesley College, and French universities in the cities of Marseilles, Grenoble, and Nancy.

In 1997, the Association for Logic Programming recognized Cohen as one of the fifteen "Founders of Logic Programming".

== Biography ==
In Belo Horizonte, Cohen attended the Engineering School of the State University of Minas Gerais. He graduated with a degree in civil engineering and a medal for having attained the best grades awarded in the preceding several years. Shortly after his graduation, Cohen was granted a Brazilian government scholarship for pursuing graduate studies in the USA.

At that time, Cohen decided to become a structural engineer. In the mid 1950s Cohen attended the Master’s program at the University of Florida, Gainesville.

Cohen continued graduate study at the University of Illinois at Urbana-Champaign, where he pursued a doctorate in Structural Design. His doctoral dissertation involved energy minimization using Raleigh-Ritz methods to determine Fourier series coefficients defining shapes of buckling columns made of thin-walled plates. This particular topic enabled Cohen to learn a great deal of assembly language programming and the solution of systems of non-linear equations resulting from the energy minimization process.

During his long career in Boston, Cohen interacted closely with Jean van Heijenoort, his colleague in the Philosophy department at Brandeis who imbued Cohen with his passion for mathematical logic.

== Early career ==
After graduating from Illinois, Cohen returned to Brazil and practiced programming on the Burroughs 205, an early electronic computer. In the early 1960s, Cohen obtained a summer position at the Bull computer company in Paris (also known as Groupe Bull) where he was assigned to the operations research group, programming in Algol 60. Cohen was invited to participate as a researcher in the compiler group in the Applied Mathematics Institute at the University of Grenoble. He was hired as a member of the National French Research Center (CNRS).

As members of the compiler group, Cohen and his colleagues were encouraged to test the compiler being developed by writing all sorts of programs, especially recursive ones. It was in Grenoble that he became interested in syntax-directed compilers. It was a unique opportunity to participate in the meetings of the IFIP group that was then designing the successor of Algol 60.

Using the Grenoble Algol 60, Cohen started developing many programs, including a Lisp-embedding in Algol, a number of parsing algorithms, and a miniature Algol compiler written in Algol. Cohen’s doctoral dissertation in Grenoble was concerned with languages for writing compilers.

== Later career ==
After his time in France, Cohen was offered a research position in MIT’s Civil Engineering department, which he held for one year. In 1968, Cohen was offered an academic position at Brandeis University and has been associated with that university ever since.

As the founder of the Computer Science Department at Brandeis University, Cohen held the position of chair for almost twelve years, beginning in the early 1980s. In 1984, Cohen directed a team at Brandeis developing software to measure the efficiency of other software programs. During his time as chair, he brought many grants to the department, from NSF to the CISE grant, which was given for the study of parallel algorithms.

During Cohen's long academic career, some highlights include: being invited to teach a compiler course at Brown University for several years, as well as at MIT; being awarded a chair in Computer Science by the Feldberg family in association with their enterprises (Zayre and later TJ Maxx); serving as the chairman of the Computer Science department for thirteen years; and finally being appointed as editor-in-chief of one of the most prestigious professional journals, the Communications of the ACM, where his tenure spanned four years.
