= Alain Colmerauer =

French computer scientist (1941–2017)

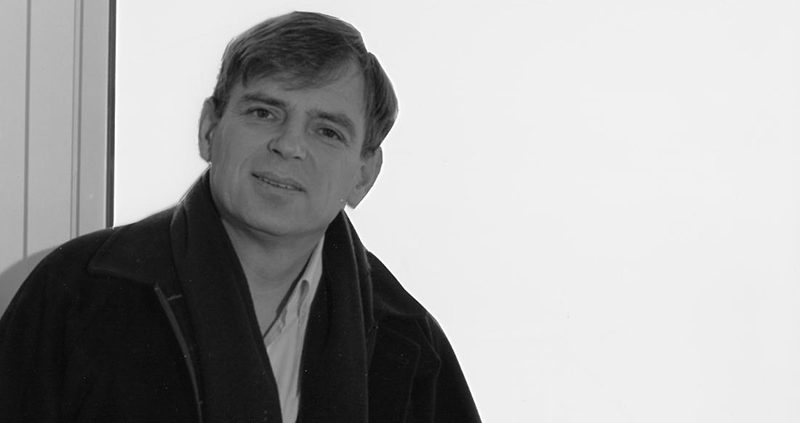
- Born: 24 January 1941; Carcassonne, France
- Died: 12 May 2017 (aged 76); Marseille, France
- Known for: Prolog
- Spouse: Colette Coursaget
- Children: 3
- Scientific career
- Thesis: Precedences, analyse syntaxique et langages de programmation (1967)
- Doctoral advisor: Louis Bolliet, Jean Kuntzman

Alain Colmerauer (24 January 1941 – 12 May 2017) was a French computer scientist. He was a professor at Aix-Marseille University, and the creator of the logic programming language Prolog.

== Early life ==
Alain Colmerauer was born on 24 January 1941 in Carcassonne. He graduated from the Grenoble Institute of Technology, and he earned a PhD from the Ensimag in Grenoble.

== Career ==
Colmerauer spent 1967–1970 as assistant professor at the University of Montreal, where he created Q-Systems, one of the earliest linguistic formalisms used in the development of the TAUM-METEO machine translation prototype. Developing Prolog III in 1984, he was one of the main founders of the field of constraint logic programming.

Colmerauer became an associate professor at Aix-Marseille University in Luminy in 1970. He was promoted to full professor in 1979. From 1993 to 1995, he was head of the Laboratoire d'Informatique de Marseille (LIM), a joint laboratory of the Centre National de la Recherche Scientifique, the Université de Provence and the Université de la Méditerranée. Despite retiring as emeritus professor in 2006, he remained a member of the artificial intelligence taskforce in Luminy.

Colmerauer won an award from the regional council of Provence-Alpes-Côte d'Azur, and in 1985 the Michel Monpetit Award, from the French Academy of Sciences. In 1986, he was made a knight of the Legion of Honour by the French government. He became Fellow of the American Association for Artificial Intelligence in 1991, and in 1997 the Association for Logic Programming bestowed upon him and fourteen other select researchers the title of Founder of Logic Programming. He then received the Association for Constraint Programming's Research Excellence Award in 2008. He was also a correspondent of the French Academy of Sciences in the area of mathematics.

== Death ==
Colmerauer died on 12 May 2017.

== The ALP Alain Colmerauer Prize ==
The ALP Alain Colmerauer Prize (in short: Alain Colmerauer Prize) is organized by the Association for Logic Programming. The Prize is given for recent accomplishments and practical advances in Prolog-inspired computing, understood in a broad sense, where foundational, technological, and practical contributions are eligible with proven evidence or potential for the future development of Logic Programming. The award of the inaugural edition of the Prize in 2022, in cooperation with the Prolog Heritage Association, was a highlight of the Year of Prolog celebrating 50 years of Prolog and logic programming.
