= Rosal de la Frontera =

- Municipality
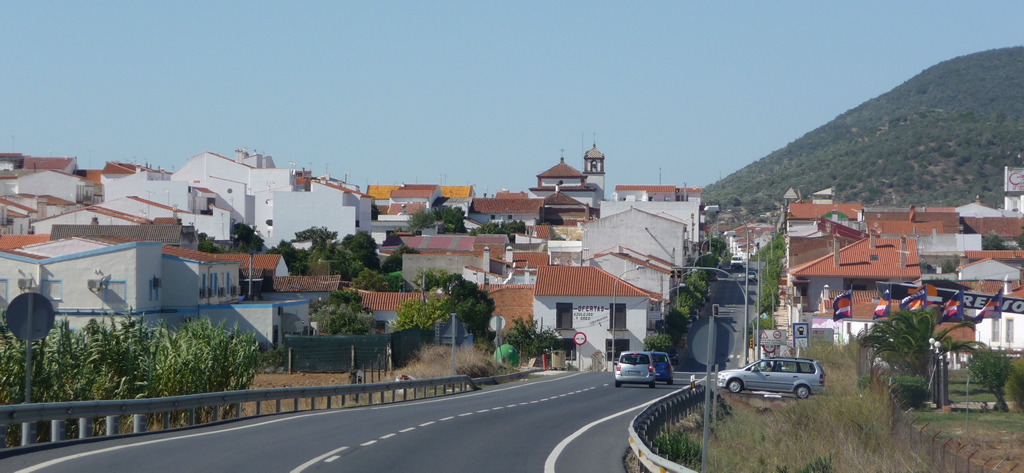

- Flag Coat of arms

- Location within Spain Location within Andalusia Location within Province of Huelva
- Coordinates: 37°58′7″N 7°13′11″W
- Country: Spain
- Autonomous community: Andalusia
- Province: Huelva

Area
  - Total: 210 km^{2} (81 sq mi)
- Elevation: 219 m (719 ft)

Population (2025-01-01)
  - Total: 1,676
  - Density: 8.0/km^{2} (21/sq mi)
- Time zone: UTC+1 (CET)
  - Summer (DST): UTC+2 (CEST)

Rosal de la Frontera is a municipality of Spain located in the province of Huelva, Andalusia. According to the 2008 census, the municipality had a population of 1846 inhabitants.

== Geography ==
=== Location ===
Located in the south-west of the Iberian Peninsula, the village lies at about 219 m above sea level, near the right bank of the Chanza River. The N-433 national road cuts across the municipality and the village, connecting the latter with the Portuguese border (which is barely 3.8 km to the West) and, a bit farther, the Portuguese freguesia of Vila Verde de Ficalho.

== See also ==
- List of municipalities in Huelva

== History ==
=== Precedents ===
The area of the Chanza riverbanks was already inhabited in the Neolithic and there is a megalithic stone circle known as "Pasada del Abad" near the village of Rosal, and within the municipal limits.

As the Portuguese Restoration War broke out, many small settlements near the border depopulated, with the inhabitants withdrawing to the bigger villages, eventually leaving the rest of the territory open to smuggling and banditry. The hamlet of El Gallego was forsaken in 1642.

=== Repopulation ===
Part of the efforts for the repopulation of Sierra Morena, from a legal standpoint the creation of Rosal steems from the 1822 Decree on the Repopulation of Large Territories and the granting of those powers to provincial deputations. The creation of Rosal was authorized in August 1834, soon after the death of Ferdinand VII. The first instructions for repopulation were issued in 1838 and by 1844 the village already had an Ayuntamiento. Originally known as Rosal de Cristina, the municipality was renamed as Rosal de la Frontera as result of the new political environment created after the 1868 Glorious Revolution.
