= Kingdom of the Algarve =

1249–1835 nominal kingdom in southern Portugal

Kingdom of the Algarve (before 1471) Reino do Algarve Kingdom of the Algarves (after 1471) Reino dos Algarves
- 1242–1835
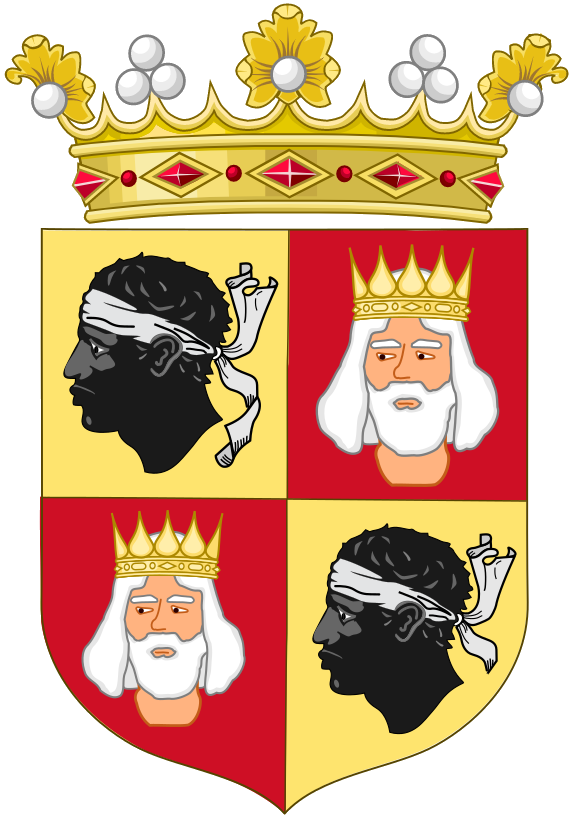
- Coat of arms

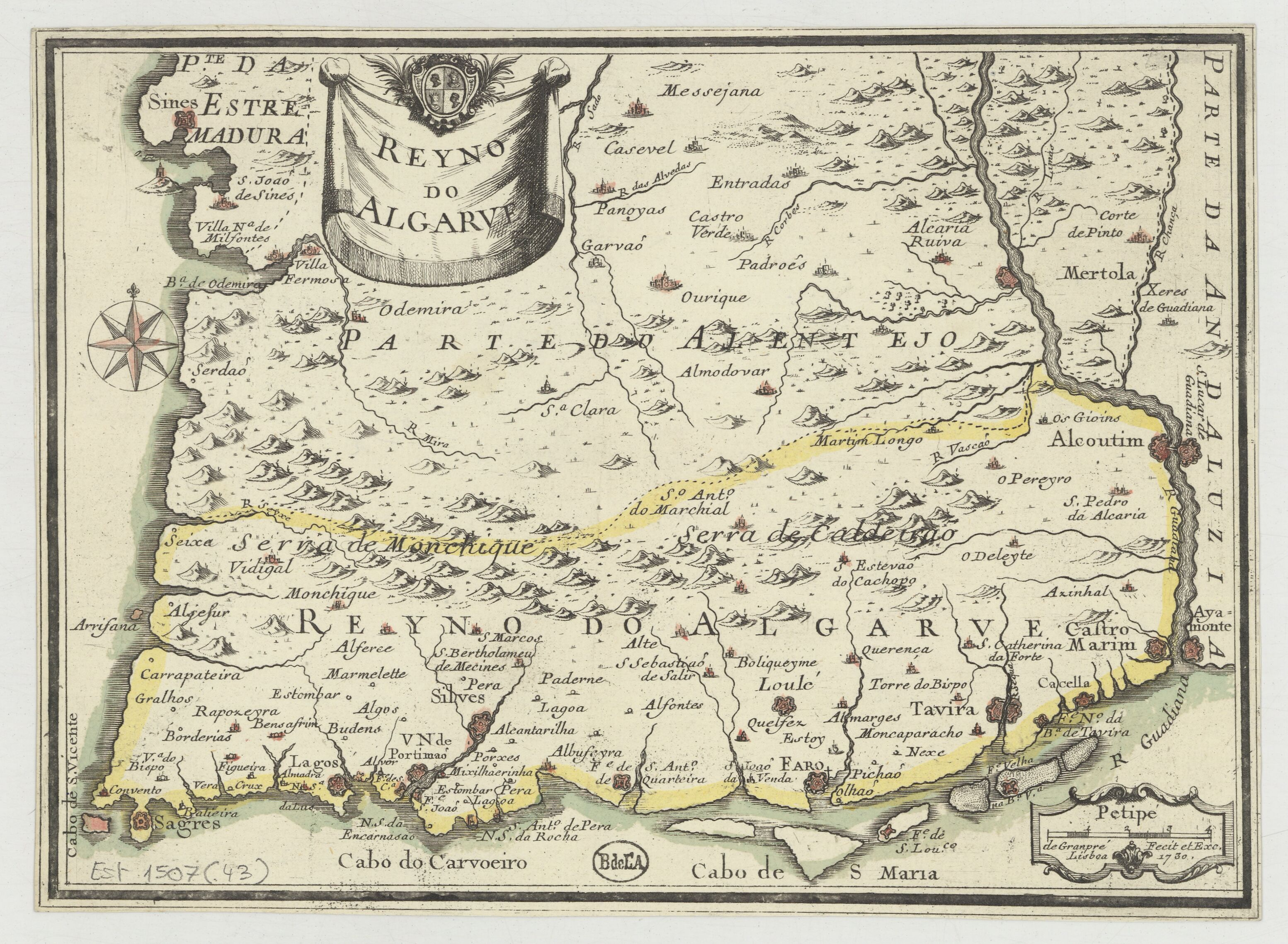
- Map of the Kingdom of the Algarve
- Status: Nominal kingdom within the Kingdom of Portugal (1249–1835); Constituent kingdom of the United Kingdom of Portugal, Brazil and the Algarves (1815–1825)
- Capital: Silves (until 1576); Lagos (1576–1755); Tavira (from 1746)
- Common languages: Portuguese
- Religion: Roman Catholic
- Government: Absolute monarchy (1249–1820; 1823–1825; 1828–1834); Constitutional monarchy (1820–1823; 1825–1828; 1834–1835)
- Monarch
  - 1249–1279: Afonso III
  - 1826–1835: Maria II
- Legislature: Cortes (1820–1835)
- History
  - Established: March 1242
  - Treaty of Badajoz: 16 February 1267
  - Conquest of Asilah and Tangiers: August 1471
  - Ceding of Tangiers to England: 23 June 1661
  - Ceding of Ceuta to Spain: 13 February 1668
  - Last North African outpost abandoned: 1769
  - United Kingdom: 16 December 1815
  - Dissolution of the United Kingdom: 29 August 1825
  - Faro District established: 18 July 1835

Population
  - 1820: c. 500,000
- Currency: dinheiro, real
Preceded by	Succeeded by
Almohad Caliphate	Faro District
- Today part of: Portugal; Spain; Morocco

The Kingdom of the Algarve (Portuguese: Reino do Algarve, from the Arabic Gharb al-Andalus غَرْب الأنْدَلُس, "Western al-'Andalus") was a nominal kingdom within the Kingdom of Portugal, located in the southernmost region of continental Portugal. From 1471 onwards it came to encompass Portugal's holdings in North Africa, which were referred to as "African Algarve" (Algarve Africano) or "Algarve-Beyond-the-Sea" (Algarve d'Além-Mar), in contrast with "European Algarve" (Algarve Europeu; Algarve d'Aquém-Mar, literally "Algarve on this side of the sea"); as such, the name of the kingdom was pluralized to Kingdom of the Algarves (Portuguese: Reino dos Algarves), even after Portugal's last North African outpost was abandoned in 1769.

Despite the name implying a degree of separateness from the rest of Portugal, it lacked any unique institutions, special privileges, or notable autonomy, and was politically very similar to other Portuguese provinces, with "King of the Algarve" being a simple honorific title, based on the Algarve's history as the last area of Portugal to be conquered from the Moors during the Reconquista.

The title King of Silves was first used by Sancho I of Portugal after the first conquest of the Algarvian city of Silves in 1189. At the time of his grandson, Afonso III of Portugal (1210–1279), the rest of the Algarve had finally been conquered, so "King of Portugal and the Algarve" then became a part of the titles and honours of the Portuguese Crown.

In 1835, the Kingdom of the Algarves ceased existing territorially, when, as part of wider administrative reforms, it was replaced by the Faro District, though the title of "King/Queen of the Algarves" remained in use by subsequent Portuguese. Castilian (and later Spanish) monarchs have also claimed the title of "King/Queen of the Algarve" following Alfonso X of Castile's conquest of the region in 1253, though this title has only been held in pretense ever since the 1267 Treaty of Badajoz confirmed Portugal's hold of the regions west of the Guadiana. Ceuta, formerly part of the so-called "African Algarve", was ceded by Portugal to Spain in the 1668 Treaty of Lisbon, as the city had refused to side with the House of Braganza in the Acclamation War, and it remains part of the Kingdom of Spain to this day.

== History ==
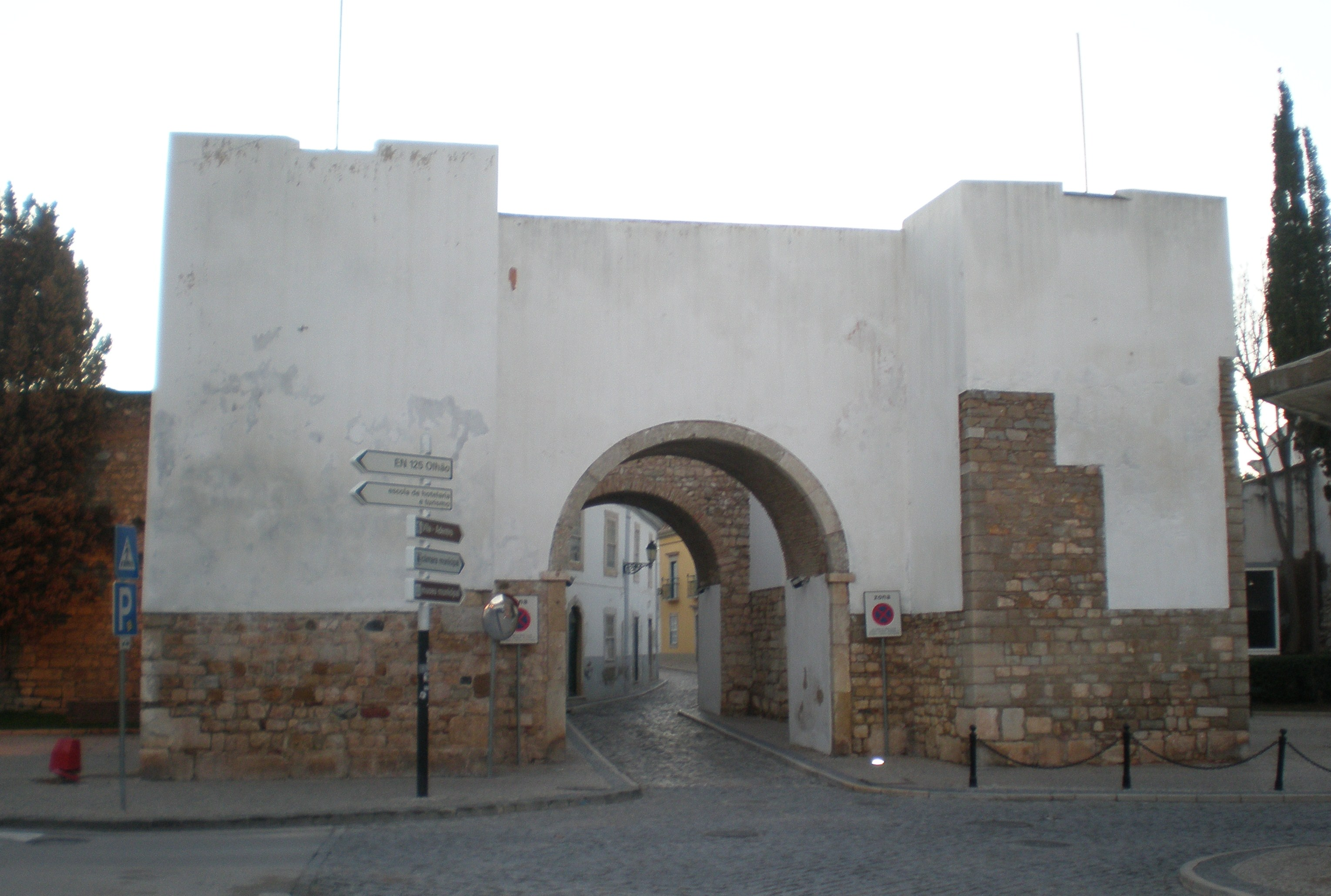
The Arch of Rest in Faro, where Afonso III of Portugal legendarily rested after the "end of the Reconquista".

=== Reconquista ===
During the Reconquista, Portuguese, Castilian and Aragonese conquests went south, to retake lands that had been conquered by Muslim armies in the 8th century. Portugal conquered and secured much of its southern borders during the reigns of King Sancho II of Portugal and King Afonso III of Portugal.

==== First conquest ====
In 1189, King Sancho I of Portugal conquered Silves, one of the most prosperous cities in Al-Andalus, aligned at the time with the Almohad Caliphate. Portuguese control over Silves would be short, with the Almohads conquering the city again in 1191 in a massive counter-attack led by Abū Yūsuf Yaʿqūb al-Manṣūr the Almohad Caliph in person.

==== The conquest of the Algarve ====
With the decline of the Almohads, the southern taifa city-states united under a single Emir, Mūsā ‘ibn Muhammad ‘ibn Nassir ‘ibn Mahfūz, former governor of Niebla, and known among the Christians as Aben Mafom.

Ibn Mafūz, King of Niebla and Emir of the Algarve, trying to counter the achievements of the Portuguese in their territories, declared himself a vassal to Alfonso X of Castile (who thus titled himself the King of the Algarve). Through his vassals, Alfonso X hoped to claim dominion over the Algarve not yet conquered by the Portuguese.

The Emir's vow of vassalage to Castile, however, did not stop the knights of the Order of Santiago, under the command of the Grand-Master Paio Peres Correia, from conquering most of the region city by city, between 1242 and 1249, including Silves. In March 1249, King Afonso III of Portugal captured Faro, the last Muslim stronghold in Algarve, ending the Portuguese Reconquista.

The entitlement of Afonso III of Portugal as King of Portugal and the Algarve would serve as a reaction to Alfonso X of Castile's claim to the Algarve, and was meant to demonstrate the Portuguese monarch's rights over the region.

The issue between the sovereigns of Castile and Portugal was eventually settled by the Treaty of Badajoz (1267), where King Alfonso X gave up his claims of the Algarve, making his grandson Dinis the heir to the throne of the Algarve, which dictated the terms of its absorption into the Portuguese crown. The treaty, though, allowed the use of the title of King of the Algarve by King Alfonso X and his descendants, since King Alfonso X had acquired the territories of Al-Gharb Al-Andalus on the other side of the Guadiana River. The kings of Castile, and later Spain, would add the title to their repertoire of titles until the ascent of Queen Isabel II of Spain to the throne.

=== Age of Discovery ===
During the Age of Discovery, many voyages started from the Algarve, mainly those funded by Prince Henry the Navigator (Infante D. Henrique). Prince Henry also set up his school of navigation at Sagres Point, though the idea of a real school building and campus is highly disputed. Most of the voyages set sail from Lagos.

==== The Algarves of either side of the sea in Africa ====
The name of the Algarvian Kingdom suffered some minor changes due to the Portuguese North African conquests, which were considered an extension of the kingdom of the Algarve. John I of Portugal added to the title of "King of Portugal and the Algarve", the title "Lord of Ceuta", and his grandson Afonso V of Portugal, in turn, styled himself "Lord of Ceuta and Álcacer-Ceguer in Africa" (after 1458). The 1471 conquest of Asilah, Tangiers and Larache, together with North African previous holdings, led to the creation of the term "Algarve-Beyond-the-Sea" (Algarve de Além-Mar), leaving the European Algarve to become "the Algarve behind the sea" (Algarve d’Aquém-Mar).

Thus, it was not until 1471 that "the Kingdom of the Algarve" led to "the Kingdom of the Algarves", due to the increase of Portuguese possessions in Northern Africa, which were made as possessions of the Kingdom of the Algarve. The Portuguese monarchs therefore adopted the title that they would use until the fall of the monarchy in 1910: "Kings of Portugal and the Algarves of either side of the sea in Africa". The title would continue to be used even after the abandonment of the last North African holding in Mazagan (Portuguese: Mazagão; lost by Portugal in 1769).

=== 19th century ===
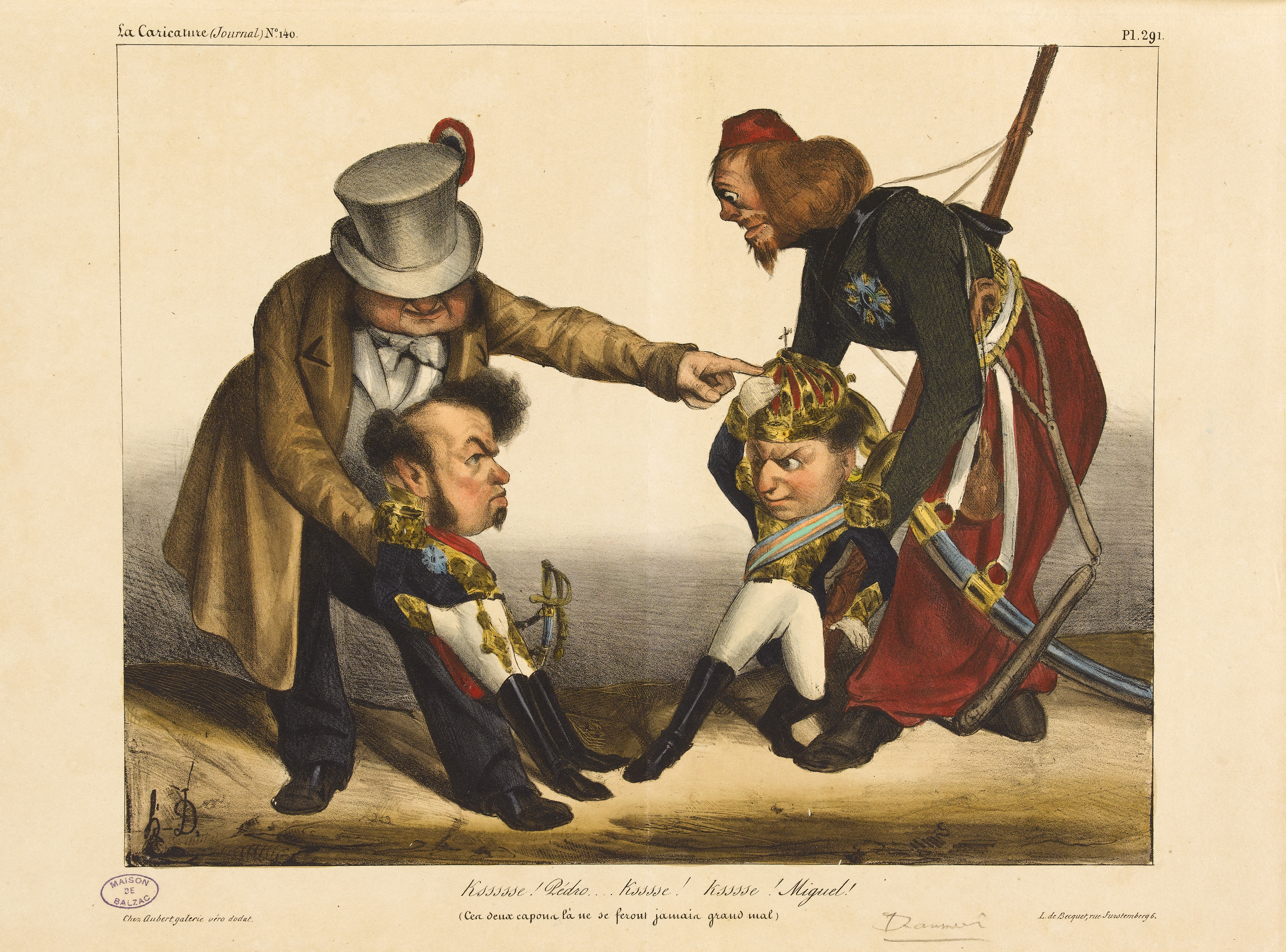
A caricature of year 1833 showing the clash between Miguel I of Portugal and Pedro IV of Portugal, which caused turmoil in the Algarve

During the 19th century, a serious clash between pro-constitutionalism liberals and pro-absolutism antiliberals, caused a civil war in Portugal (1828–1834), and in Algarve an exodus of people from the Algarvian inlands to the coastal cities. José Joaquim de Sousa Reis, an antiliberal known as Remexido, fought in the inlands and attacked the coastal cities, bringing the urban population into turmoil. The turmoil of the Algarve intensified in the years between 1834 and 1838, when the Algarve saw battles on a level it had never seen before. On November 26, 1836, Miguel I of Portugal, already defeated and living in exile, named Remexido Governor of the Kingdom of the Algarve and Acting Commander in Chief of all the Royalist Troops, Regular and Irregular Armies, and the Operations in the South. Remexido, however, was captured near São Marcos da Serra and shot in Faro on August 2, 1838, after being subjected to a summary trial.

The Kingdom of the Algarve was de facto abolished in 1834 with the extinction of the post of Governor of Arms of the Kingdom of the Algarves. Ceasing to exist as a kingdom after the royal decree of 18 July 1835, which established a system of districts subject to civilian governors, with the territory of former Kingdom of Algarve being replaced by the Faro District. In practice, this changed very little as the "kingdom" appellation was largely a formality and the territory was run like any other Portuguese province throughout its formal existence. Portuguese and Spanish monarchs also continued to style themselves as "Kings/Queens of the Algarve".

== List of governors ==
The day-to-day administration of the Kingdom fell to the Governor of Arms of the Kingdom of the Algarves, which had no special powers when compared to the Governors of Arms of other Portuguese provinces.

The monarch of Portugal was also the monarch of the Algarves, continuing to hold the title even after the Kingdom of the Algarves was nominally abolished in 1835, right up until the implantation of the republic. Castilian (and later Spanish) monarchs also claimed the title of King/Queen of the Algarves, beginning with Alfonso X.

Overall, 56 individuals held the post, 6 of which served only as interim governors. Additionally, governors Duarte de Meneses and Vasco de Mascarenhas served 2 non-consecutive terms each, while Nuno de Mendonça served 3 non-consecutive terms, totalling 60 governorships.

Number	Governor of Arms of the Kingdom the Algarves (Birth–Death)	Portrait	Term start	Term end	Notes	King/Queen of Portugal and the Algarves (Start of reign–End of reign)
1	Diogo de Sousa		1573	1578	First Governor of Arms of the Kingdom of the Algarves.	Sebastian I (1557–1578)
2	Francisco da Costa		1578	1580		Henry I (1578–1580)
3	Dom Duarte de Meneses (1537–1588)		1580	1581	Served two terms	Philip I (1580–1598)
4	Martim Correia da Silva (?–1582)		1581	1583	From the Correia da Silva family, known for producing several mayors of Tavira, including himself.	Philip I (1580–1598)
(3)	Dom Duarte de Meneses (1537–1588)		1583	1584	Second and final term.	Philip I (1580–1598)
5	Fernão Telles de Meneses (1530–1605)		1584	1595		Philip I (1580–1598)
6	Rui Lourenço de Távora (1556–1616)		1595	1606		Philip I (1580–1598)
6	Rui Lourenço de Távora (1556–1616)		1595	1606		Philip II (1598–1621)
7	Diogo de Meneses, 1st Count of Ericeira (1553–1635)		1606	1606		Philip II (1598–1621)
8	Manuel de Lencastre		1606	1614		Philip II (1598–1621)
9	João de Castro		1614	1621?		Philip II (1598–1621)
10	Luís Tomé		1621?	1622?	Son of the previous governor.	Philip III (1621–1640)
11	Afonso de Noronha (c. 1550–1627)		?	1623		Philip III (1621–1640)
12	Pedro Manuel, Count of Atalaia (?–1628)		1623	1624		Philip III (1621–1640)
13	João Furtado de Mendonça		1624	1630		Philip III (1621–1640)
14	Luís de Sousa, Count of Prado (c. 1580–1643)		1630	1633		Philip III (1621–1640)
15	Gonçalo Coutinho		1633	1638		Philip III (1621–1640)
16	Henrique Correia da Silva (1560–1644)		1638	1641	From the Correia da Silva family.	Philip III (1621–1640)
16	Henrique Correia da Silva (1560–1644)		1638	1641	From the Correia da Silva family.	John IV (1640–1656)
17	Vasco de Mascarenhas, 1st Count of Óbidos (1605–1678)		1641	1642	First governor to be appointed following the Portuguese restoration of independence. Served two terms.	John IV (1640–1656)
18	Martim Afonso de Melo, 2nd Count of São Lourenço (c. 1580–1671)		1642	1646		John IV (1640–1656)
19	Nuno de Mendonça, 2nd Count of Vale de Reis (1612–1692)		1646	1646	From the Mendonça family. Served three terms.	John IV (1640–1656)
(17)	Vasco de Mascarenhas, 1st Count of Óbidos (1605–1678)		1646	1648	Second and final term.	John IV (1640–1656)
20	Francisco de Melo		1648	1651		John IV (1640–1656)
(19)	Nuno de Mendonça, 2nd Count of Vale de Reis (1612–1692)		1651	1658	Second of three terms.	John IV (1640–1656)
(19)	Nuno de Mendonça, 2nd Count of Vale de Reis (1612–1692)		1651	1658	Second of three terms.	Afonso VI (1656–1683)
21	Martim Correia da Silva		1658	1663	Grandson of the earlier Martim Correia da Silva. Would also go on to serve as mayor of Tavira.	Afonso VI (1656–1683)
22	Luís de Almeida, 1st Count of Avintes (1610–1671)		1663	1667		Afonso VI (1656–1683)
(19)	Nuno de Mendonça, 2nd Count of Vale de Reis (1612–1692)		1667	1671	Third and final term.	Afonso VI (1656–1683)
21	Nuno da Cunha de Ataíde, 1st Count of Pontével (c. 1610–1696)		1671	1675		Afonso VI (1656–1683)
22	Simão Correia da Silva, Conde da Castanheira		1675	1679	From the Correia da Silva family. Would go on to serve as mayor of Tavira.	Afonso VI (1656–1683)
23	Luís da Silveira, 2nd Count of Sarzedas (1640–1706)		1679	1682		Afonso VI (1656–1683)
24	Francisco Luís da Gama, 2nd Marquis of Nisa (1636–1707)		1682	1692	5th Count of Vidigueira.	Afonso VI (1656–1683)
24	Francisco Luís da Gama, 2nd Marquis of Nisa (1636–1707)		1682	1692	5th Count of Vidigueira.	Peter II (1683–1706)
25	Eugénio Aires Saldanha Meneses e Sousa		1692	1699		John V (1706–1750)
26	Fernando de Mascarenhas, 2nd Marquis of Fronteira (1655–1729)		1699	1701		John V (1706–1750)
27	António de Almeida, 2nd Count of Avintes (c. 1640–1710)		1701	1703		John V (1706–1750)
28	João de Lencastre		1703	1707		John V (1706–1750)
29	Fernando de Noronha, 8th Count of Monsanto		1707	1716		John V (1706–1750)
30	Martim Afonso de Melo, 4th Count of São Lourenço		1716	1718		John V (1706–1750)
31	Belchior da Costa Rebelo		1718	1719	Interim governor.	John V (1706–1750)
32	José Pereira de Lacerda, Bishop of the Algarve (1662–1738)		1718	1720		John V (1706–1750)
33	Dom João Xavier Teles de Meneses, 5th Count of Unhão		1720	1742		John V (1706–1750)
34	Luís Peregrino de Ataíde, 10th Count of Atouguia (1700–1758)		1742	1750		John V (1706–1750)
35	Afonso de Noronha		1750	1754		Joseph I (1750–1777)
36	Rodrigo António de Noronha e Meneses		1754	1762	Moved the capital from Silves to Tavira following the 1755 earthquake.	Joseph I (1750–1777)
37	Henrique de Meneses, 3rd Marquis of Louriçal (1727–1787)		1762	1765		Joseph I (1750–1777)
38	Tomás da Silveira e Albuquerque Mexia		1765	1773		Joseph I (1750–1777)
39	José Francisco da Costa e Sousa		1773	1782		Joseph I (1750–1777)
39	José Francisco da Costa e Sousa		1773	1782		Mary I and Peter III (1777–1786)
40	Brigadier Agostinho Jansen Moller		1782	1782	Interim governor.	Mary I and Peter III (1777–1786)
41	António José de Castro, 2nd Count of Resende		1782	1786		Mary I and Peter III (1777–1786)
42	Nuno José de Mendonça e Moura, 6th Count of Vale de Reis (1733–1799)		1786	1795	From the Mendonça family.	Mary I (1777–1816)
43	Francisco de Melo da Cunha de Mendonça e Meneses, 1st Count of Castro Marim (1761–1821)		1796	1808	Leader of the Olhão Revolt. Would later become the 1st Marquis of Olhão.	Mary I (1777–1816)
44	Francisco Gomes do Avelar, Bishop of Faro in Algarve (1739–1816)		1808	1816	Interim governor.	Mary I (1777–1816)
45	Colonel John Austin		1816	1817	Interim governor.	John VI (1816–1826)
46	Colonel Francisco José da Fonseca		1817	1820	Interim governor.	John VI (1816–1826)
47	Brigadier Diocleciano Leão Cabreira (1772–1839)		1820	1821	Interim governor. Would later become the Baron of Faro.	John VI (1816–1826)
48	Brigadier Sebastião Drago Valente de Brito Cabreira (1763–1833)		1821	1823	Brother of the preceding governor.	John VI (1816–1826)
48	Brigadier José Correia de Mello		1823	1824		John VI (1816–1826)
49	João de Noronha Camões de Albuquerque Sousa Moniz, 6th Marquis of Angeja (1788–1827)		1824	1826		John VI (1816–1826)
50	Count of Alba		1826	1828		Mary II (1826–1853, de jure) (1826–1828; 1834–1853, de facto)
51	Lieutenant Colonel Luís Inácio Xavier Palmeirim		1828	1828		Mary II (1826–1853, de jure) (1826–1828; 1834–1853, de facto)
52	Lieutenant General Francisco de Borja Garção Stockler (1759–1829)		1828	1829	Would go on to become the 1st Baron of Vila da Praia.	Mary II (1826–1853, de jure) (1826–1828; 1834–1853, de facto)
53	Field Marshal Maximiano de Brito Mouzinho		1829	1830		Mary II (1826–1853, de jure) (1826–1828; 1834–1853, de facto)
54	Count of Santa Marta		1830	1830		Mary II (1826–1853, de jure) (1826–1828; 1834–1853, de facto)
55	António Vieira de Tovar de Magalhães e Albuquerque, 1st Count of Molelos		1830	1833		Mary II (1826–1853, de jure) (1826–1828; 1834–1853, de facto)
56	António Pedro de Brito Vila Lobos, 1st Baron of Cacela		1834	1835	First governor following the end of the Liberal Wars, and the last to hold the post. Succeeded by José Maria de Vilhena Pereira de Lacerda as the civil governor of the Faro District on 25 July 1835. The exiled Michael I would appoint Field Marshal José Joaquim de Sousa Reis as "Governor of the Algarve" in 1836, but he remained a guerilla leader and never carried out any administrative duties.	Mary II (1826–1853, de jure) (1826–1828; 1834–1853, de facto)

== See also ==
- Kingdom of Portugal
- United Kingdom of Portugal, Brazil and the Algarves
- Algarve
- Gharb al-Andalus
- Portuguese Inquisition in Goa and Bombay-Bassein
