= Treaty of Lisbon (disambiguation) =

The Treaty of Lisbon, if the date is unspecified, usually refers to a 2007 treaty between member states designed to reform the European Union.

Treaty of Lisbon may also refer to:

- Treaty of Lisbon (1667), a Franco-Portuguese alliance during the Portuguese Restoration War
- Treaty of Lisbon (1668), a peace treaty that ended the Portuguese Restoration War between Portugal and Spain, granting independence to Portugal
- Treaty of Lisbon (1859), a treaty between Portugal and the Netherlands on the border between Portuguese Timor and the Dutch East Indies
- Treaty of Lisbon (1864), a treaty between Spain and Portugal on the border between the two countries
- Treaty of Lisbon (1926), also known as Convention of Limits, a treaty between Spain and Portugal on the border between the two countries

== See also ==
- Lisbon Agreement (disambiguation)
- Energy Charter Treaty signed in Lisbon in 1994
