= Autovía A-49 =

Road in Spain

Autovía A-49
- Autovía del Quinto Centenario
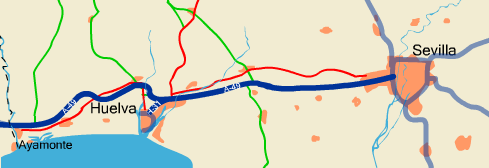

Route information
- Part of
- Length: 132 km (82 mi)

Major junctions
- From: Seville
- To: Portugal–Spain border

Location
- Country: Spain

Highway system
- Highways in Spain; Autopistas and autovías; National Roads

The Autovía A-49 is a major highway in Andalusia, Spain. It starts on the ring road of Seville and heads west with a spur south A-483 to Almonte, the Costa de la Luz and the Doñana National Park. The road crosses the Rio Tinto and the Odiel river north of Huelva and ends on the Portugal–Spain border 133 km west of Seville where it connects to the A22 motorway (Portugal) on the Guadiana International Bridge over the Guadiana River. It is also European route E1.
