= Guadiana International Bridge =

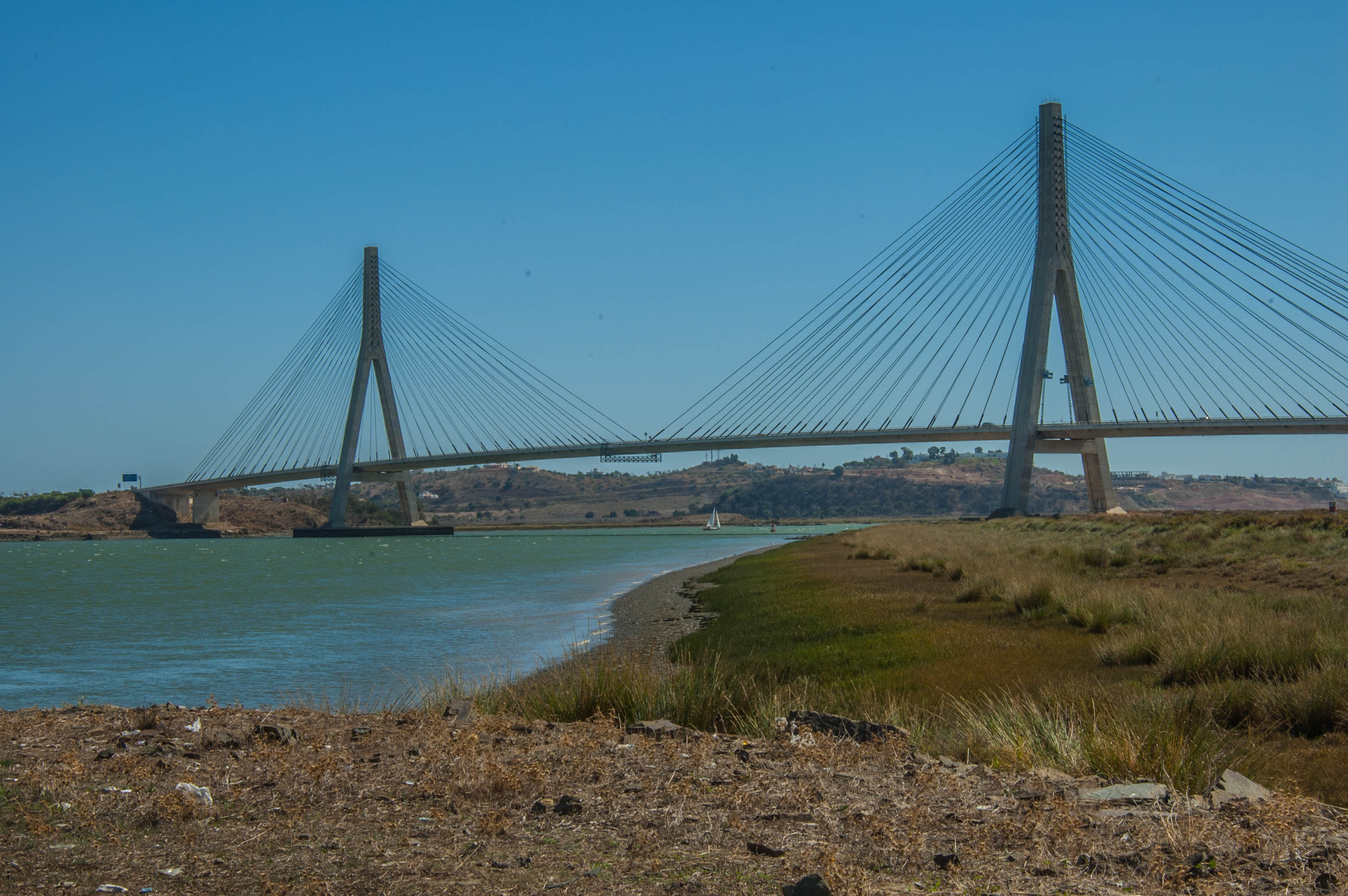
- Coordinates: 37°14′15″N 7°25′08″W
- Carries: 4 lanes of Via do Infante de Sagres A22 motorway (Portugal) / Autopista del Quinto Centenario A-49 Motorway (Spain)
- Crosses: Guadiana River
- Locale: Portugal–Spain border: – Right/West bank of the Guadiana (Portuguese Side): Castro Marim, Algarve – Left/East bank of the Guadiana (Spanish Side): Ayamonte, Andalucia
- Official name: Guadiana International Bridge

Characteristics
- Design: cable-stayed bridge, with a deck of prestressed concrete
- Total length: 666 m (2,185.0 ft)
- Longest span: 324 m (1,063.0 ft)
- Clearance below: 20 m (65.6 ft)

History
- Engineering design by: José Luis Câncio Martins
- Constructed by: Huarte S.A. and Teixeira Duarte
- Opened: 22 August 1991; 34 years ago

Statistics
- Daily traffic: Vehicles only
- Toll: Free on both sides, unless continuing on A22 after crossing into Portugal

Location
- Interactive map of Guadiana International Bridge

The Guadiana International Bridge (Spanish: Puente Internacional del Guadiana; Portuguese: Ponte Internacional do Guadiana) is a bridge that crosses the Guadiana River connecting southern Spain (town of Ayamonte) and Portugal (town of Castro Marim). It is the southernmost land crossing on the Portugal–Spain border. It is not split evenly between the two countries, with a greater share of it situated in Portugal. Completed in 1991, its structural type is a cable-stayed bridge, with a deck of prestressed concrete. The bridge was designed by the Portuguese Structural Engineer Professor José Luis Câncio Martins on behalf of Huarte S.A. (now Obrascón Huarte Lain) and Teixeira Duarte. The bridge is open to vehicles only. It is the third longest bridge in Portugal and one of the longest in Spain.

The bridge is 666 metres long with the central span between the towers being 324 metres. The deck stands 20 metres above the river, allowing the navigation of ships of deep draft. The two towers of the bridge are 95 and 96 metres tall, respectively. The Spanish side tower rests on an artificial island built on the riverbed, while the pillar on the Portuguese side is on land.

The bridge connects the Via do Infante de Sagres A22 motorway (Portugal) to the Autopista del Quinto Centenario A-49 Motorway (Spain), and is part of the European route E1.

== History ==
In the 1960s Portugal and Spain conducted studies to determine if a bridge in the area was possible. These began in 1963 and ended in 1985 with the signing of an agreement between the two countries.

== See also ==
- Guadiana Roman bridge
- Lower Guadiana International bridge
- Our Lady of Help Bridge
- List of international bridges
