= Treaty of Badajoz =

The Treaty of Badajoz may refer to these accords signed in Badajoz, Spain:

- Treaty of Badajoz (1267)
- Treaty of Badajoz (1801)
