= Castle of Alegrete =

Medieval castle in Alegrete, Portalegre, Portugal

- Castelo de Alegrete
- Portalegre, Alto Alentejo, Alentejo in Portugal
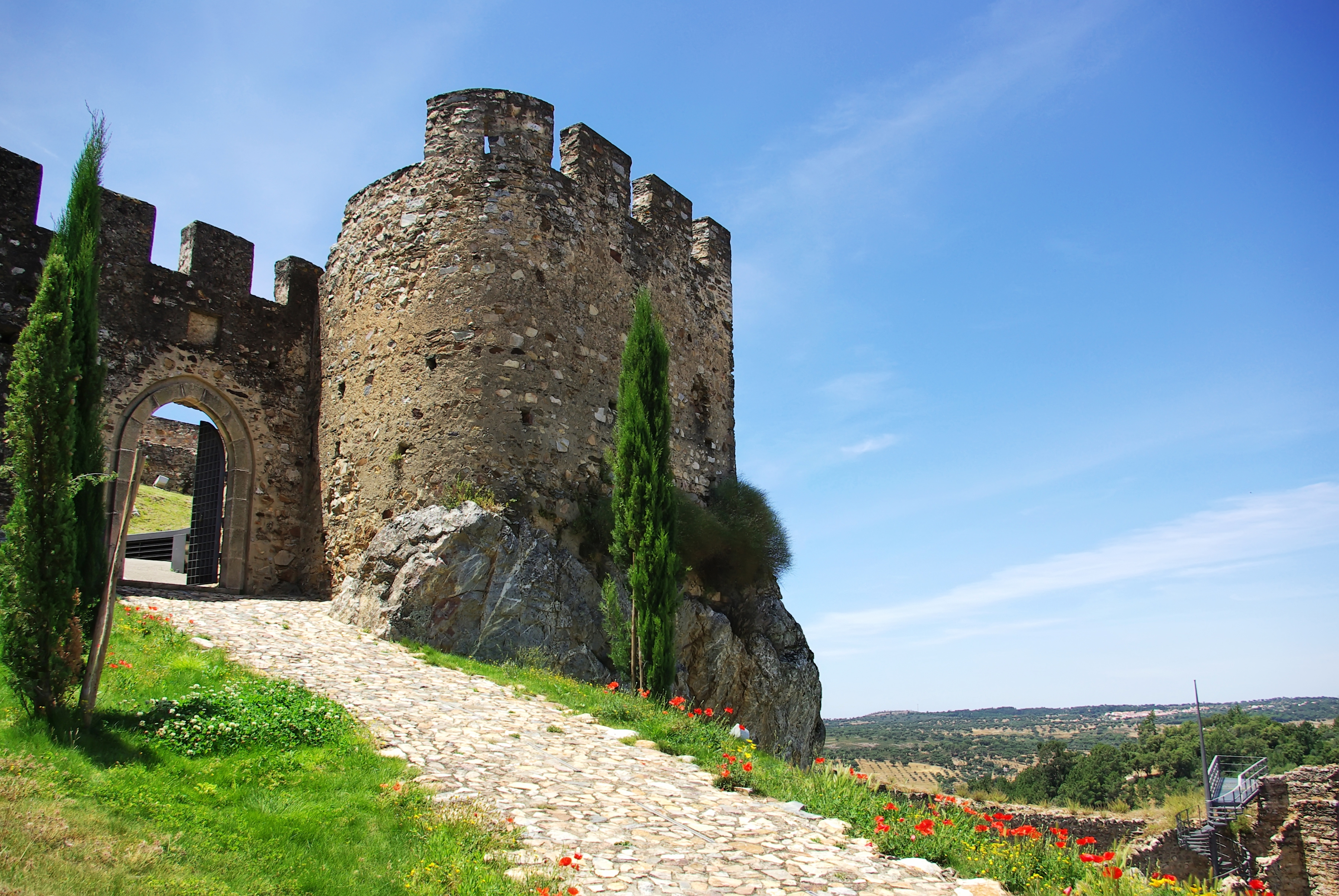
- The entrance to the medieval castle of Alegrete

Site information
- Type: Castle
- Owner: Portuguese Republic
- Open to the public: Public

Location
- Location of the castle within the municipality of Portalegre
- Coordinates: 39°14′13.2″N 7°19′21.1″W

Site history
- Built: 1160

The Castle of Alegrete (Portuguese: Castelo de Alegrete) is a Portuguese medieval castle in the civil parish of Alegrete, in the municipality of Portalegre, in the district of the same name.

== History ==
Just 10 kilometres (6.2 mi) from Portalegre, the castle of Alegrete is one of the more important fortress in the Alto Alentejo, assuming since the Middle Age, a fundamental position in regional defense. Most of the references to its origins are obscure. Traditional literature suggest that its history extends to the primordials of the Portuguese kingdom. Legend suggests that Alegrete was reconquered from the Moors in 1160 by D. Afonso Henriques.

The first documents suggest it dated from the 13th century, during the reign of King D. Afonso III, when the fortifications were either constructed or reconstructed.

On 16 February 1267, the settlement was effectively incorporated into the possessions of the Portuguese Crown, in the Treaty of Badajoz, celebrated between King D. Afonso III and his father-in-law King D. Alfonso X of Castile.

The reconstruction of the fortifications are attributed to the foral (charter) of King D. Dinis in 1319. Most of the building on the site occurred between the 13th and 14th century, but likely began immediately after the accord at Badajoz. The perimeter of the fortification was quite irregular, and did not adopt the oval plan generally used during the Portuguese Gothic period. The keep tower was erected alongside the eastern walls and located near a cistern, that supported the community within the walls and military garrison. The main gateway was in the south (today concealed) and crowned by small tower with machicolations towards the interior. Complementing the military garrison was a curtain of walls connected to the castle. In the following centuries, Alegrete took on an important role in the wars with Castile.

On 8 April 1384, D. Nuno Alvares Pereira visited Alegrete as part of his defense of Portugal.

A new foral was issued on 14 February 1516 by King D. Manuel I. The transition between medieval warfare and pyroballistic warfare determined the slow decline of the castle. Meanwhile, though, the dynastic crisis resulting from the death of King Sebastian at Alcácer Quibir, revitalized the importance of the medieval castle, owing to its frontier position along the Spanish border. Under the influence of the Marquess of Marialva, the walls were repaired and updated, during a rapid reconstruction process. The work resulted in a fortress with bastions, but little today remains to identify its limits.

At the end of the 17th century, King D. John IV compensated General Matias de Albuquerque by making him the Count of Alegrete, and putting the castle on the first line of defense during the Portuguese Restoration War. By 1662, the garrison of Alegrete was composed of two infantry companies, under the command of La Costé. As legend suggests, the Governor dissuaded John of Austria (whose forces had encircled the settlement) from attacking, offering him two bottles of wine and suggesting that the Portuguese garrison would resist until the last of the wine produced in Alegrete. Work on the walls were carried out by Luís Serrão Pimentel following their damage.

On 12 July 1664, there is record of repairs and rehabilitation of the fortifications under the direction of the Marquess of Marialva.

On 19 August 1687, the Marquess of Alegrete was instituted, in the name of its first Marquess, D. Manuel Teles da Silva.

In 1704, Portuguese forces situated in Alegrete resisted the siege by Philip V of Spain.

During the course of the War of the Oranges at the beginning of the Peninsular Wars, forces stationed in Alegrete resisted Spanish bombardment in 1801. But, the castle was already irreversibly in decline. Within twenty years, the conflict between Absolutists and Liberals erupted within Portugal, leading to combat within the castle's proximity, between troops of the Count of Vila Flor and royalist forces.

As part of political reforms the municipality and magisterial courts in Alegrete were extinguished on 26 June 1855.

== Architecture ==
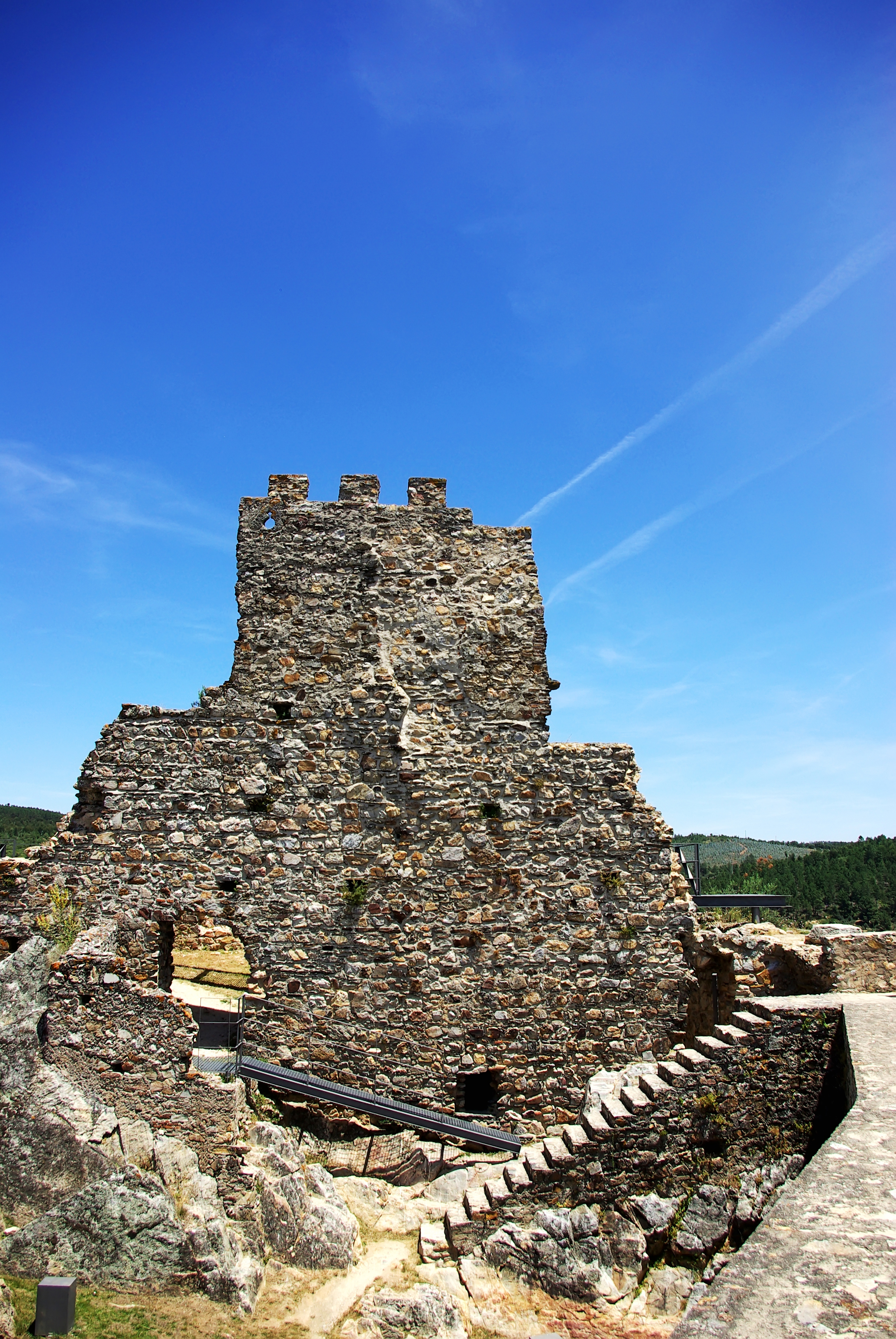
The ruined tower and fortifications along the southern line of defenses

The urban fortifications, with castle to the south, delimit the primitive settlement on top of the mountain, at about 502.9 metres (1,650 ft) altitude. On the northern flank supported the town, called the Arrabalde, and the rest of the flanks are occupied by agricultural fields, with olive orchards, broken by the Ribeira de São Pedro (also called Ribeira do Ninho d'Açor) in the west. The location of the fortifications, at the top of the mountain, makes it an ideal lookout over the vast landscape below.

Much of the walls are in a state of ruin; yet, there are several trenches still conserved, including the "Vila" Gate, a prototype of typical Gothic gates. The castle comprises an irregular plan, delimited by the "Vila" Gate in the north and along the east the "Traitors'" Gate (also called the "Sun" Gate). At this point there are ruins in east that could have been the keep tower, with cistern and pavement with door to the south. Over the cistern is another pavement above the stairs that extend from the patio. The tower appears to have been divided in two from the cistern. To the west of the tower is a small tower and terrace that opens to a patio. In the south-southwest of the castle are the remains of a cubel/watchtower, with a rectangular surface, that accessible from a staircase addorsed from the southern wall. Much of the interior of the castle is occupied by rocks and unlevel ground.

The urban walls extend from the cardinal directions from the castle: two walls to the southwest (extending from the "Santana" Gate); west from a cubel, that continues to the north; the wall, then, inflects towards the east-southeast (at the Rua do Forno Gate); connects to the "Villa" Gate between two corbels, continues along to the a cubel in the east (with only minor interruption); before inflecting to the south, connecting the castle and terminating in the southwest.
