= Aroche =

- Municipality
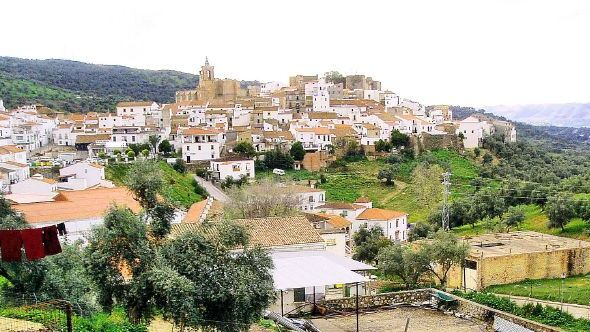

- Flag Coat of arms

- Location within Spain Location within Andalusia Location within Province of Huelva
- Coordinates: 37°57′N 6°57′W
- Country: Spain
- Autonomous community: Andalusia
- Province: Huelva

Government
  - Mayor: José Antonio Muñiz Carrasco

Area
  - Total: 499 km^{2} (193 sq mi)
  - Land: 499 km^{2} (193 sq mi)
  - Water: 0.00 km^{2} (0 sq mi)

Population (2025-01-01)
  - Total: 2,991
  - Density: 5.99/km^{2} (15.5/sq mi)
- Time zone: UTC+1 (CET)
  - Summer (DST): UTC+2 (CEST)

Aroche (Portuguese: Arouche) is a municipality of Spain located in the province of Huelva, Andalusia. According to the 2025 municipal register, the town has a population of 2,991 inhabitants.

== History ==
The Roman city of Arucci Turobriga, in the Hispania Baetica, was established during the reign of Augustus in 15-10 BC, probably as the merger of two older Celtic towns: Arucci and Turobriga. This city was located in the plains below current Aroche, by the Ermita de San Mamés. Although it has been speculated that this corresponds to the original Turobriga, it is still unclear whether this is the case, since there are barely any sources on Turobriga apart from a list of towns by Pliny the Elder and the epithet Turobrigensis applied to the local deity Ataegina.

Arucci Turobriga was mostly depopulated during the late Roman Empire and was later settled by the Almohades, who built its castle in the 12th century, during the reign of Abu Yaqub Yusuf, who also oversaw the construction of the Giralda in Seville. Similarly to Moura and Serpa, Aroche and Aracena may have been conquered by the Order of the Hospital and incorporated to the Kingdom of Portugal during the reign of Sancho II, circa 1230–1233, although it has been suggested the Christian occupation may have had to wait to the void of Muslim power in the area caused by the Fall of Seville in the late 1240s. The area, occupied by Afonso III of Portugal by 1251, was theoretically granted together with Aracena to the Crown of Castile in 1253, although the effective and definitive transfer happened in 1267 as settled in Treaty of Badajoz. In fact, Afonso III granted Aroche a fuero in 1255.

== Demographics ==
Historical population
Year	Pop.	±%
1999	3,517	—
2000	3,503	−0.4%
2001	3,446	−1.6%
2002	3,384	−1.8%
2003	3,396	+0.4%
2004	3,360	−1.1%
2005	3,319	−1.2%
Source: INE (Spain)

== Gallery ==
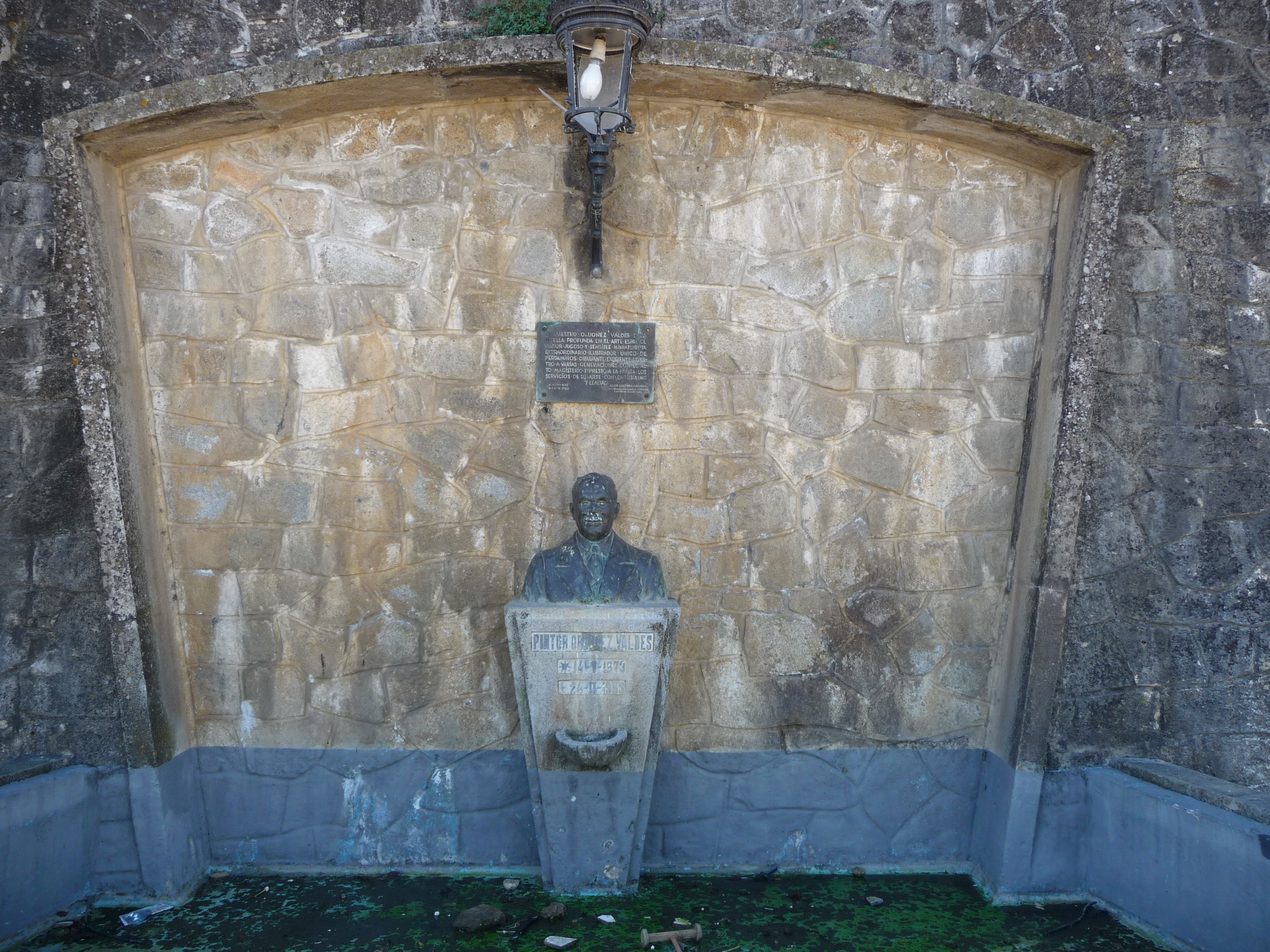
Monument

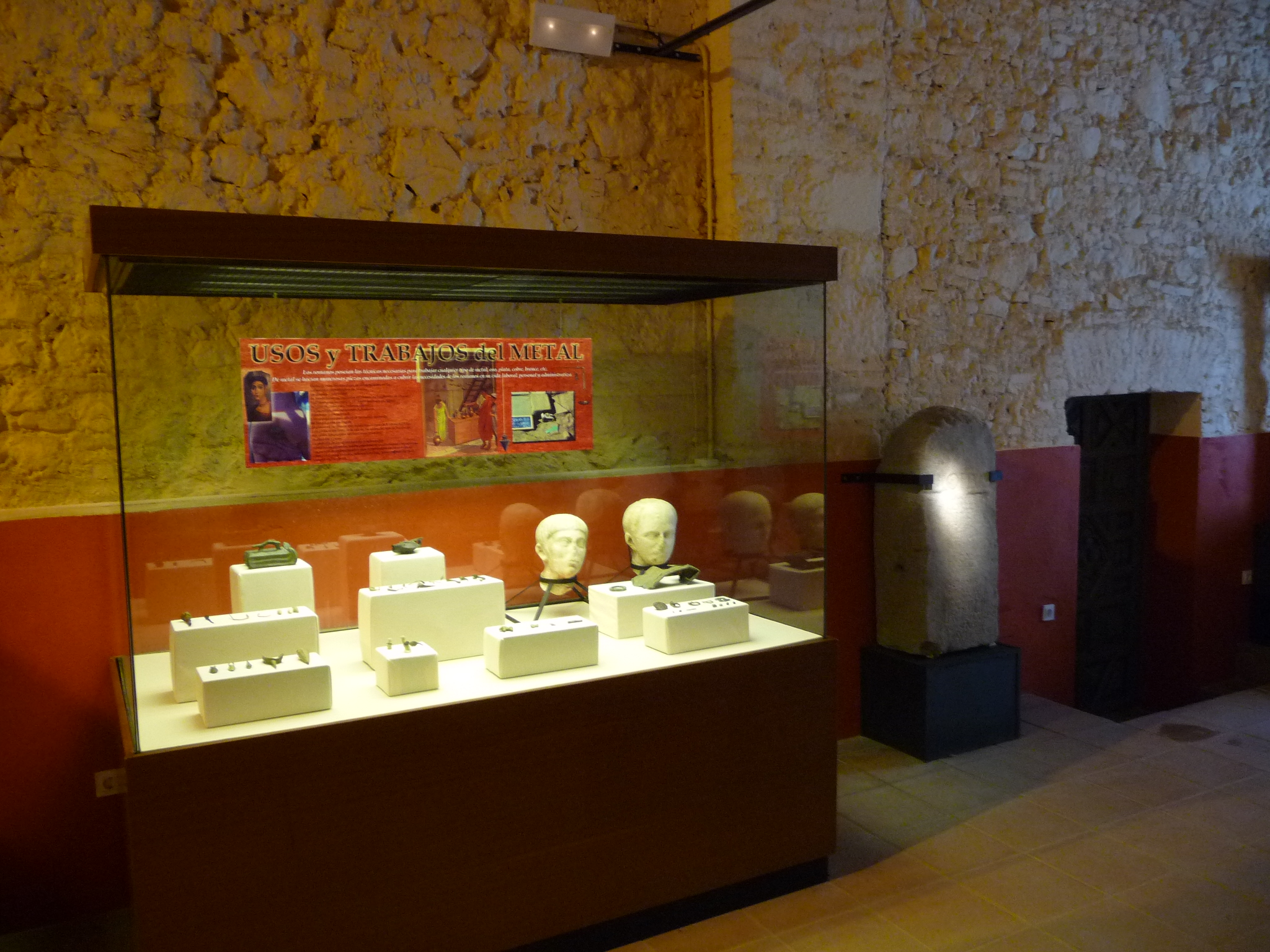
Roman remains in the archaeological museum

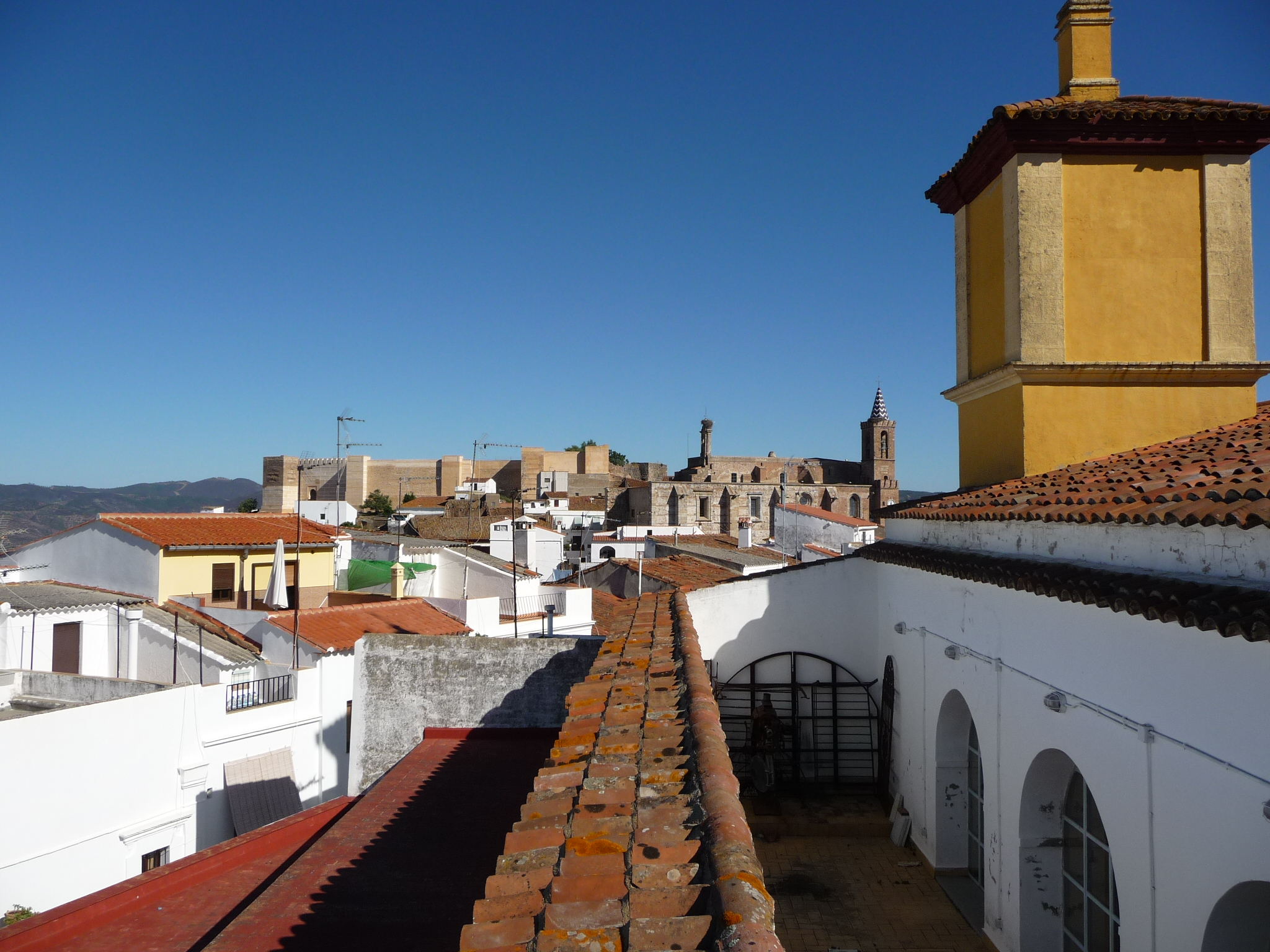
The Castle

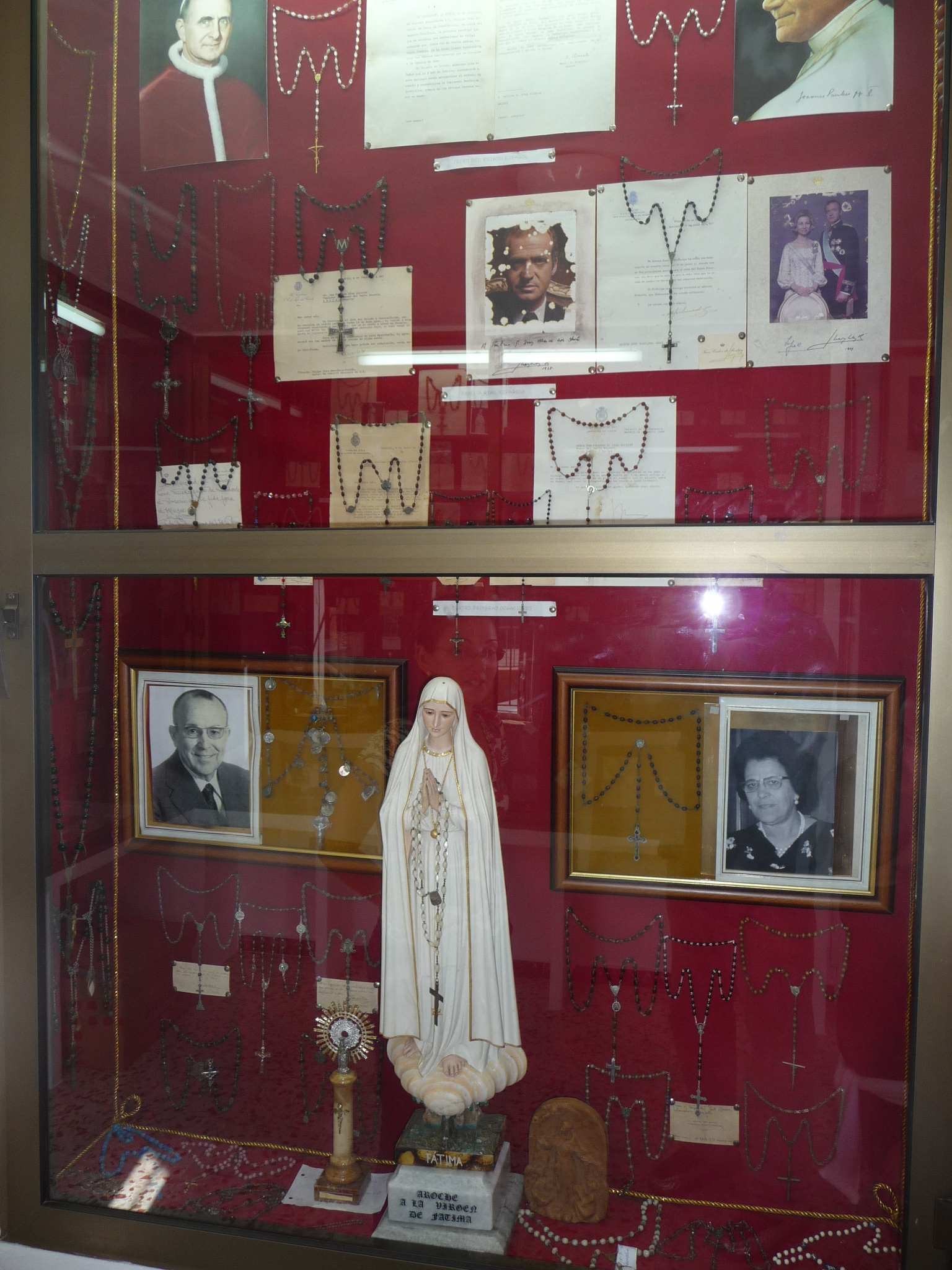
Museo del Rosario

== See also ==
- List of municipalities in Huelva
