= Ribeira de Cuncos =

Ravine in Portugal

Coordinates: 38°26′17.0″N 7°19′56.0″W

Ribeira de Cuncos is a Portuguese ravine that marks the southern point of the disputed section of the Portugal-Spain border, (Arroyo de Cuncos in Spanish).

Portugal does not recognise the border between Caia and Ribeira de Cuncos River deltas, since the beginning of the 1801 occupation of Olivenza by Spain. This territory, though under de facto Spanish sovereignty, remains (from a Portuguese point of view) a de jure part of Portugal, consequently no border is henceforth recognised in this area.

The Castle of Cuncos situated nearby dates from pre-Roman time (specifically, the Iron Age). Today is completely submerged under the man made Alqueva reservoir created by the Alqueva dam. In the area, ancient foundations and remains belonging to the era have been discovered.

It runs into the Guadiana river.
