= Chanza River =

Border river in southern Portugal and Spain

Coordinates: 37.5546°N 7.5229°W

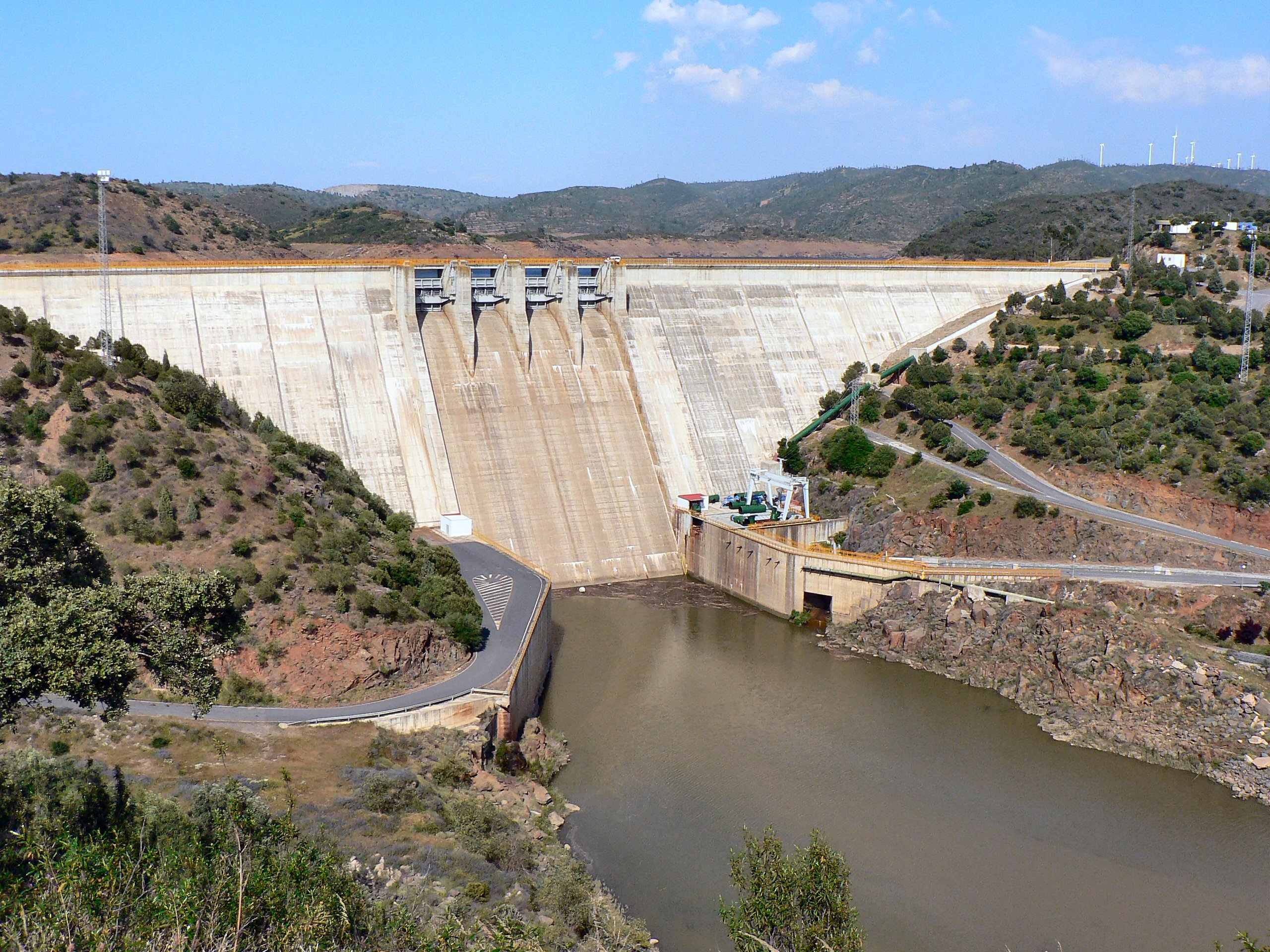
Barragem do Chança

The Chanza River (Chança in Portuguese) is a river on the Iberian Peninsula. The river arises in the Aracena Mountains in Spain and later forms part of the Portugal–Spain border. The river can be crossed by using the Lower Guadiana International bridge.

== See also ==
- List of rivers of Portugal
- List of rivers of Spain
