= Lisbon Agreement =

Lisbon Agreement may refer to:

- Lisbon Agreement for the Protection of Appellations of Origin and their International Registration (1958)
- Lisbon Agreement (1980), an agreement between Britain and Spain relating to Gibraltar
- Lisbon Agreement (1992), a peace plan proposed during the buildup to the Bosnian War

== See also ==
- Treaty of Lisbon (disambiguation)
