= Lower Guadiana International bridge =

Lower Guadiana International Bridge
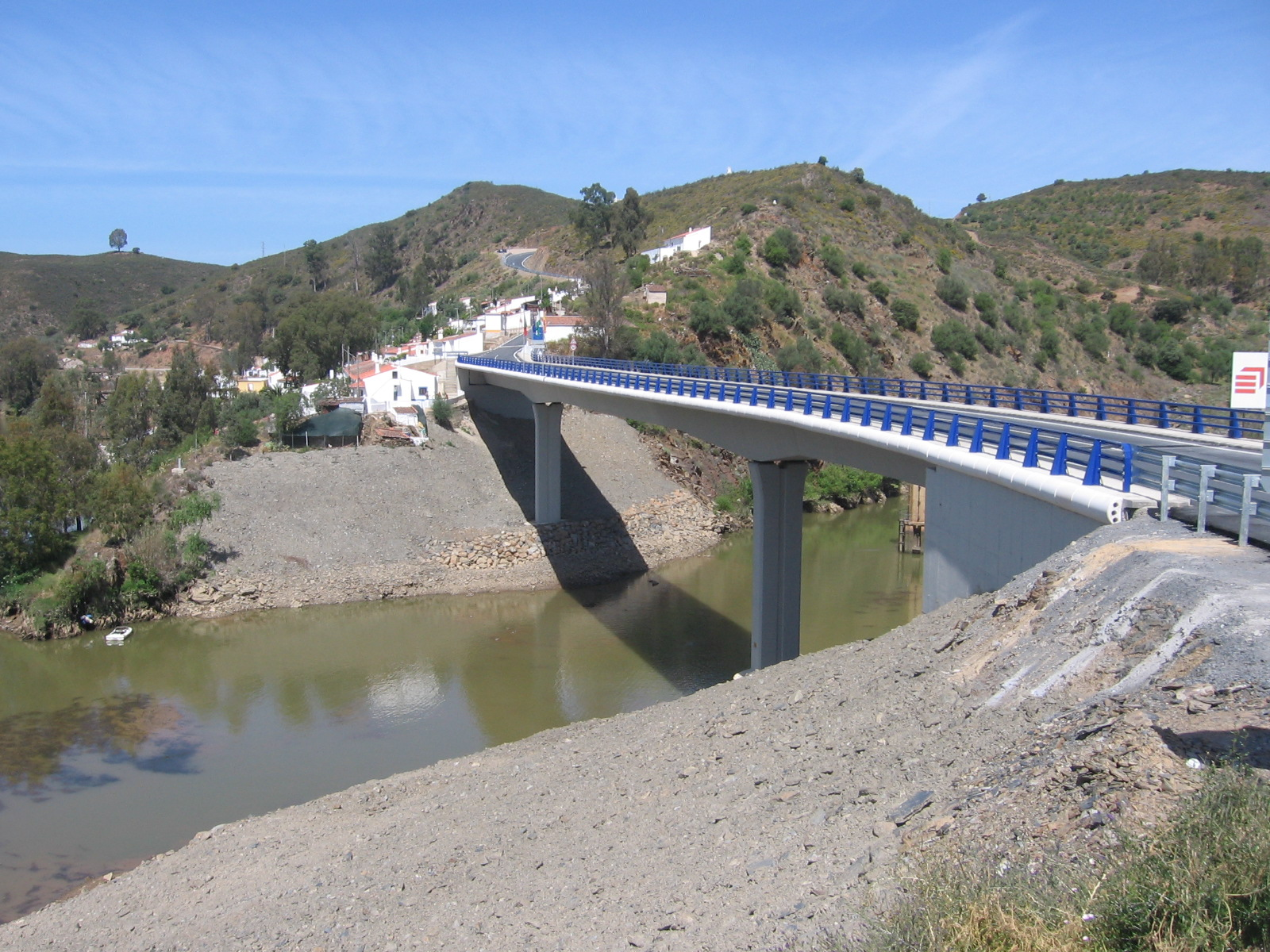
- Coordinates: 37°33′20″N 7°31′21″W
- Crosses: Chança River
- Locale: Portugal-Spain border: – Right/West bank of the Chança River (Portuguese Side): Pomarão – Left/East bank of the Chança River (Spanish Side): El Granado
- Official name: Lower Guadiana International Bridge

Characteristics
- Total length: 140 m (459.3 ft)
- Width: 11 m (36.1 ft)

History
- Opened: 26 February 2009; 16 years ago

Statistics
- Toll: Free on both sides

The Lower Guadiana International Bridge (Spanish: Puente Internacional; Portuguese: Ponte Internacional) is a bridge that crosses the Chança River connecting southern Spain and Portugal.

Since early December 2016 to June 2017 the bridge was closed due to a landslide on the Spanish side of the bridge.

== See also ==
- Guadiana Roman bridge
- Guadiana International Bridge
- Our Lady of Help Bridge
- List of international bridges
