= Convention of Limits (1926) =

1926 agreement between Portugal and Spain

The Convention of Limits (1926) was a convention signed between Portugal and Spain, signed on 29 of June 1926, in Lisbon.

Portugal and Spain signed an agreement demarcating the border from the confluence of Ribeira de Cuncos with the Guadiana, just south of Olivenza, to the estuary of the Guadiana River, on the far South. The border between Portugal and Spain from the confluence of the Caia (river) to the confluence of the Ribeira de Cuncos is not demarcated and remains so nowadays, with the Guadiana River being the de facto border.
