= A22 motorway (Portugal) =

Road in Portugal

A22
- Portuguese: Via do Infante de Sagres

Route information
- Length: 133 km (83 mi)

Major junctions
- West end: Lagos
- East end: Castro Marim

Location
- Country: Portugal

Highway system
- Roads in Portugal

The A22 (Portuguese: Via do Infante de Sagres) is the principal motorway (freeway) in the Algarve, Portugal. Named after Henry the Navigator, it connects Lagos to Castro Marim and connects to the A-49 Motorway (Spain) on the Guadiana International Bridge over the Guadiana River. It is also part of European route E01.

The A22 is operated by Euroscut Algarve.

Construction on A22 began in 1991 and was completed in 2003. It extends 133 km. It became a toll road in 2011 but the tolls were abolished from 1 January 2025.
