= Vasco Mascarenhas, 1st Count of Óbidos =

Portuguese nobleman and colonial governor

His Lordship The Count of Óbidos OC
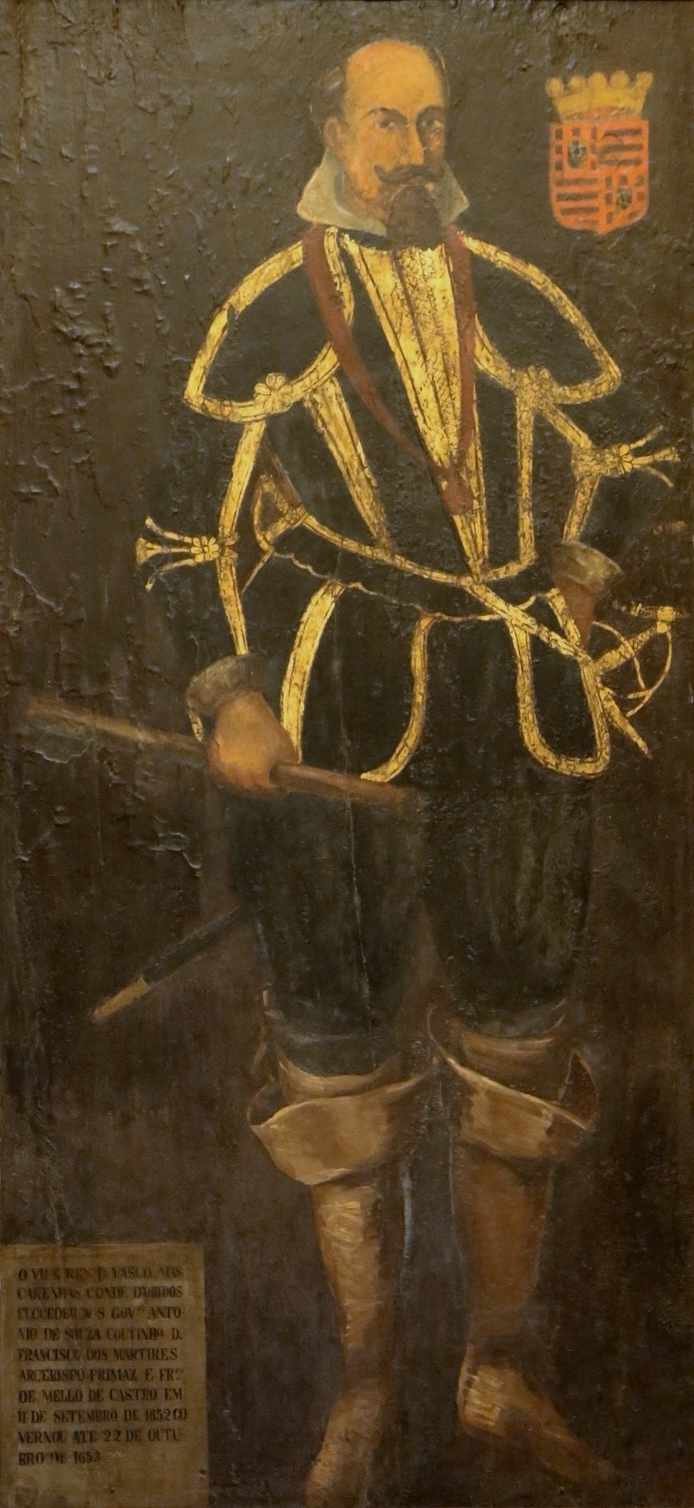
- Portrait at the Gallery of Viceroys and Governors of India, Goa

17th Governor General of Brazil
- In office 30 November 1639 – May 1640
- Preceded by: Fernando de Mascarenhas
- Succeeded by: Jorge de Mascarenhas

27th Viceroy of Portuguese India
- In office 1652–1653
- Preceded by: Governing Council
- Succeeded by: Brás de Castro

2nd Viceroy of Brazil
- In office 21 July 1663 – 13 June 1667
- Preceded by: Francisco Barreto de Meneses
- Succeeded by: Alexandre de Sousa Freire

Personal details
- Born: Vasco Mascarenhas ca. 1605
- Died: 4 July 1678

General Vasco Mascarenhas, 1st Count of Óbidos, OC (c. 1605–4 July 1678), was a Portuguese nobleman and colonial governor, who was Governor General of Brazil, Viceroy of Brazil and Viceroy of India.

== Biography ==
He was the son of Fernão Martins Mascarenhas, Lord of Lavre, and his wife, Maria of Lancaster, great-grandchild of Dinis of Braganza, Count of Lemos and a dynast of the House of Lancaster and of the House of Braganza.

Before being appointed Viceroy of Brazil, Dom Vasco Mascarenhas had gained experience in Bahia as Mestre de Campo (1626–1634), General of Artillery (1638–1639), and interim Governor of Brazil (1639–1640).

He received the title of Count of Óbidos in 1636 from Philip IV of Spain. Following the Restoration of 1640, this title was confirmed by John IV of Portugal in 1646. In 1662, the Secretary of State Count of Castelo-Melhor appointed him as a member of the Council of State.

== See also ==
- Portuguese Royal Family
- Portuguese Empire

Preceded by 2nd Interim Council of Government of Portuguese India	Viceroy of Portuguese India; 1652–1653	Succeeded by Brás de Castro
