= Teixeira Duarte =

Portugal-based company

Teixeira Duarte S.A.
- Teixeira Duarte's Logo
- Type: Joint-stock company
- Traded as: Euronext Lisbon: TDSA
- ISIN: PTTD10AM0000
- Industry: Conglomerate
- Founded: 1921
- Founder: Eng.º Ricardo Esquível Teixeira Duarte
- Headquarters: Oeiras, Portugal
- Area served: Portugal, South Africa, Angola, Algeria, Cape Verde, Gabon, Morocco, Mozambique, Brazil, Colombia, Ecuador, United States, Peru, Venezuela, China, Kuwait, Qatar, Belgium, Spain, France, Luxembourg, and United Kingdom.
- Products: Construction; Concessions and Services; Real Estate; Hospitality; Distribution; Automotive
- Operating income: €1,049 million (2019)
- Net income: €14 million (2016)
- Number of employees: 11,000 (in 2019)
- Website: www.teixeiraduarte.com/

Teixeira Duarte, S.A. is a company that leads a large conglomerate with more than 11,000 workers, present in 22 countries, in 6 activity sectors, achieving in 2019 a turnover of 877 million Euros.

Teixeira Duarte, S.A. is listed at Euronext Lisbon since 1998, Being its shareholder majority of the Teixeira Duarte family. The Group's headquarters are located at Lagoas Park, in Oeiras.

== History ==
Teixeira Duarte was founded in 1921 by the engineer Ricardo Esquível Teixeira Duarte. In 1934 was incorporated as a limited liability company and, in 1987 was transformed in a joint-stock company. The company has been listed on Euronext Lisbon since 1998.

The sustained growth in construction over decades has enabled the Group to progressively develop other activity sectors due to the business opportunities it has encountered and fostered since the 1970s, such as concessions and services (since 1984), real estate (since 1973), hospitality (since 1992), distribution (since 1996), energy (since 1996) and automotive (since 1991). Although in 2016 it still operated in the energy sector – where it had operated since 1996 – Teixeira Duarte divested its stake in the entity through which it maintained its activity in this sector in the first quarter of 2017.

With a consolidated process of internationalisation, Teixeira Duarte has long operated in other markets which are nowadays still important in its operations, such as Venezuela (since 1978), Angola (since 1979), Mozambique (since 1982), Spain (since 2003), Algeria (since 2005) and Brazil (since 2006), currently also added by France, Belgium, United Kingdom, Luxembourg, the United States, Colombia, Ecuador, Peru, Morocco, South Africa, China, Qatar, Kuwait, Gabão, and Cabo Verde.

== Main indicators ==
	2012	2013	2014	2015	2016	2017	2018	2019
Average number of workers	10 853	12 011	13 261	13 359	11 271	10 560	10 530	11 000
Turnover	1 383	1 581	1 680	1 412	1 115	1 036	874	877
Operating income	1 440	1 630	1 716	1 492	1 230	1 100	1 014	1049
EBITDA	209	214	240	214	266	181	143	190
EBITDA / Turnover margin	15.1%	13.5%	14.3%	15.1%	23.8%	17,5%	16,3%	21,7%
EBIT	143	114	197	125	191	134	84	130
Net Income attributable to shareholders	24	64	70	34	20	-5	11	14
Net debt	990	1 176	1 293	1 147	1 133	854	689	718
Total equity attributable to shareholders	252	325	458	468	396	368	368	300
Total equity	326	361	485	518	445	409	403	337
Total net assets	2 767	2 779	2 954	2 862	2 540	2 294	1 858	1 850

Notes:

- The values are expressed in million euros.
- Total Equity includes non-controlling interests.

== Business sectors ==
=== Construction ===
Construction is the origin of the Teixeira Duarte Group, which started as a construction company. Construction is the core business of Teixeria Duarte Group and of its business: Teixeira Duarte – Engenharia and Construções, S.A. Operating in the fields of Geotechnical Engineering and Rehabilitation, Buildings, Infrastructures, Metalworking, Underground Works, Railway Works and Maritime Construction Works, Teixeira Duarte – Engenharia and Construções, S.A. relies on a Formwork and Pre-stressing Operations Centre; a large-scale Equipment Department; and a Materials Laboratory. It also receives support from the Teixeira Duarte Operations Centre located at Montijo.

The Group also owns shareholdings in companies that operate in specific Construction areas, namely Underground, Railway and Maritime Construction Works. Moreover, the Group participates in Joint Ventures and partnerships formed in connection with specific projects, namely in the Infrastructures area.

Main companies in this sector:

- Teixeira Duarte – Engenharia e Construções, S.A.
- EPOS – Empresa Portuguesa de Obras Subterrâneas, S.A.
- SOMAFEL – Engenharia e Obras Ferroviárias, S.A.

=== Concessions and services ===
The Teixeira Duarte Group began its operations in this area in 1984, in Macau, through a holding in CPM – Companhia de Parques de Macau, S.A. which it still owns and to which it has added, others in Portugal, Angola, Brazil, Spain, Mozambique and Venezuela until 2017 when a corruption scandal was uncovered. Currently, the Group's companies focus on different business areas, in particular facilities management, facilities services and the environment.

Main companies in this sector:

- TDGI
- Recolte Espanha

цУжх

=== Real estate ===
Teixeira Duarte Group started operating in the real-estate sector in the 1970s, and since then has expanded its real estate operations to several segments and countries. In addition to Portugal, the real-estate sector is currently present in Angola, Brazil, Mozambique, Spain and United States of America. In line with the business diversification strategy adopted by the Teixeira Duarte Group, the real-estate area, as a natural, logical extension of the parent company's core business, has been following a consistent, systematic land acquisition policy in the markets where the Group operates. Accordingly, the Group has purchased a large number of plots with a wide variety of uses, namely residential, corporate, trade and services and logistics.

Main companies in this sector:

- Teixeira Duarte Imobiliária
- Teixeira Duarte Incorporação (Brazil)

=== Hospitality ===
After a first experience in 1974 in the Algarve, the Teixeira Duarte Group resumed its activity in the Hospitality sector in Sines in the 1990s, and currently operates eight, two of which are located in Portugal, three in Angola and three in Mozambique, covering a total of 3,000 beds and 1,500 rooms.

Teixeira Duarte also develops business in the Fitness area, namely through two Health Clubs: LAGOAS Health Club at Lagoas Park, in Oeiras, and TRÓPICO Health Club at Hotel Trópico, in Luanda.

Main companies in this sector:

- TDHotels

=== Distribution ===
The Teixeira Duarte Group started operating in the Distribution sector in 1996, in Angola, through a food product distribution company.

Having expanded and diversified its distribution business, the Group currently operates in several markets, namely Angola (through DCG and CND), Brazil (through TDD Brazil), Portugal (through TDD) and South Africa (through GND).

CND, one of the companies operating in Angola, owns one of the best-known grocery store chains – "MAXI" and "bompreço" – as well as furniture and household goods brand "Dakaza" and more recently developed its area of health and wellness with "Farmácia Popular".

The "MAXI" and "bompreço" chain features 15 shops in Luanda, Luanda Sul, Cacuaco, Viana, Mulemba, Zango, Benguela, Lobito, Porto Amboim and Sumbe. Launched in 2014, the "Dakaza" brand already boasts 5 shops in Luanda and Benguela. "Farmácia Popular" features 3 stores at Maxipark Cacuaco, Maxipark Rocha Pinto and Maxipark Morro Bento, all inside Luanda's metropolitan area.

DCG, the other company operating in Angola, is the exclusive distributor of a wide range of brands.

Main companies in this sector:

- Teixeira Duarte Distribuição, S.A
- CND – Companhia Nacional de Distribuição, Limitada (Maxi, Dakaza and Farmácia Popular in Angola)
- DCG – Distribuição e Comércio Geral, Limitada
- OCC – Operador Central de Comércio, Limitada

=== Automotive ===
Teixeira Duarte Group started operating in the Automotive sector in 1991, in Angola, currently operating also in Portugal.

The Group develops its activity in Angola through a group of companies that represent several international brands in the following market segments:

- Light Vehicles: Nissan, Chevrolet, Peugeot, Renault, Mahindra & Mahindra, JMC, SsangYong, Isuzu.
- Heavy-duty Vehicles: UD Trucks, Renault Trucks, Randon.
- Motorcycles: Piaggio/Gilera/Vespa, Honda Motorcycles, Hyosung, Derbi, Loncin.
- Equipment: Nissan Forklift, Heli, Denyo, Honda Power Products, Pramac and Powermate.
- Tires and Lubricants: Infinity, Continental, Avia.

Currently, the Group operates in the country through a large distribution network which includes their own and external concessions, as well as specialized retail. In this segment, there is a recently launched PIWI insignia, with 2 stores in Luanda, which sells automobile accessories, motorcycles and generators. In some stores are also provided quick repair services.

In Portugal, the Group Teixeira Duarte sells Suzuki brand since 2016 through its subsidiary SMotors, which represents in exclusive the Japanese brand in the district of Lisbon. The first dealer of SMotors, located at Avenida Marechal Gomes da Costa.
