= Vila Verde de Ficalho =

Civil parish in Alentejo, Portugal

- Civil parish
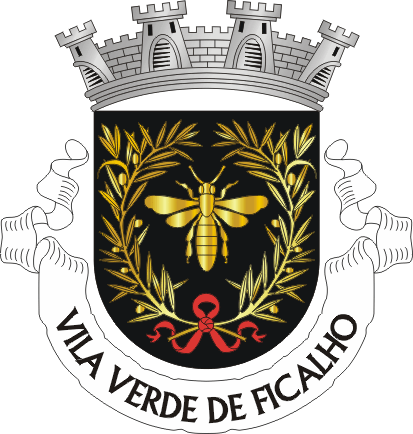
- Coat of arms

- Location in Portugal
- Coordinates: 37.947°N 7.300°W
- Country: Portugal
- Region: Alentejo
- Intermunic. comm.: Baixo Alentejo
- District: Beja
- Municipality: Serpa
- Time zone: UTC+00:00 (WET)
  - Summer (DST): UTC+01:00 (WEST)

Vila Verde de Ficalho is a civil parish in the municipality of Serpa, Portugal. It is one of the main crossings on the Portugal–Spain border.
