= Caia (river) =

River in Portugal and Spain

Coordinates: 38°52′32.1″N 7°2′10″W

Caia (Rio Caia)
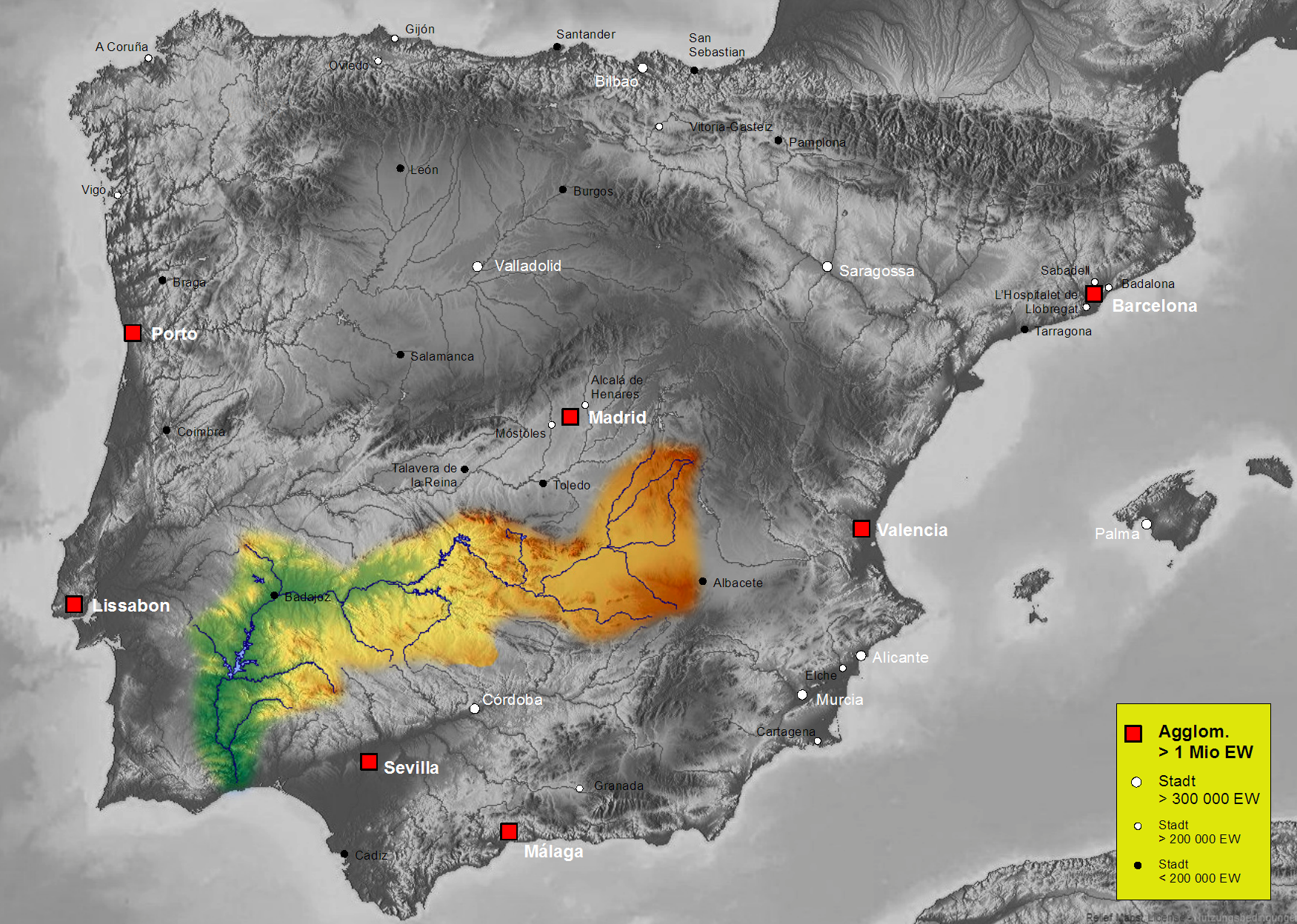
- The Guadiana river basin in the Iberian Peninsula

Location
- Country: Spain, Portugal

Physical characteristics
- Source
  - location: Serra de São Mamede, Portugal
- Mouth
  - location: Guadiana River, near Badajoz, Spain
- Basin size: 846 km^{2} (327 sq mi)

Basin features
- Progression: Guadiana→ Gulf of Cádiz

The Caia (Portuguese pronunciation: [ˈkajɐ]) or Caya is a river in the Iberian Peninsula, a tributary to the Guadiana. It is one of the main water courses in the Portalegre District, Portugal. Portugal does not recognise part of the border along the Guadiana between the rivers Caia and Ribeira de Cuncos, since the annexation of Olivenza by Spain in 1801. This territory, though de facto and de jure Spanish, remains de jure disputed by Portugal.

== Course ==
It has its sources in the Serra de São Mamede and for the lower 11 kilometres (7 mi) of its course it forms the international Portugal-Spain border. Finally it joins the Guadiana River southwest of the city of Badajoz in Extremadura, Spain.

== Tributaries ==
- Arronches, also known as Alegrete
- Algalé

== Dams ==
- Caia Dam, with the largest reservoir of Portalegre District
