= Treaty of Alcañices =

1297 treaty between Portugal and Castile

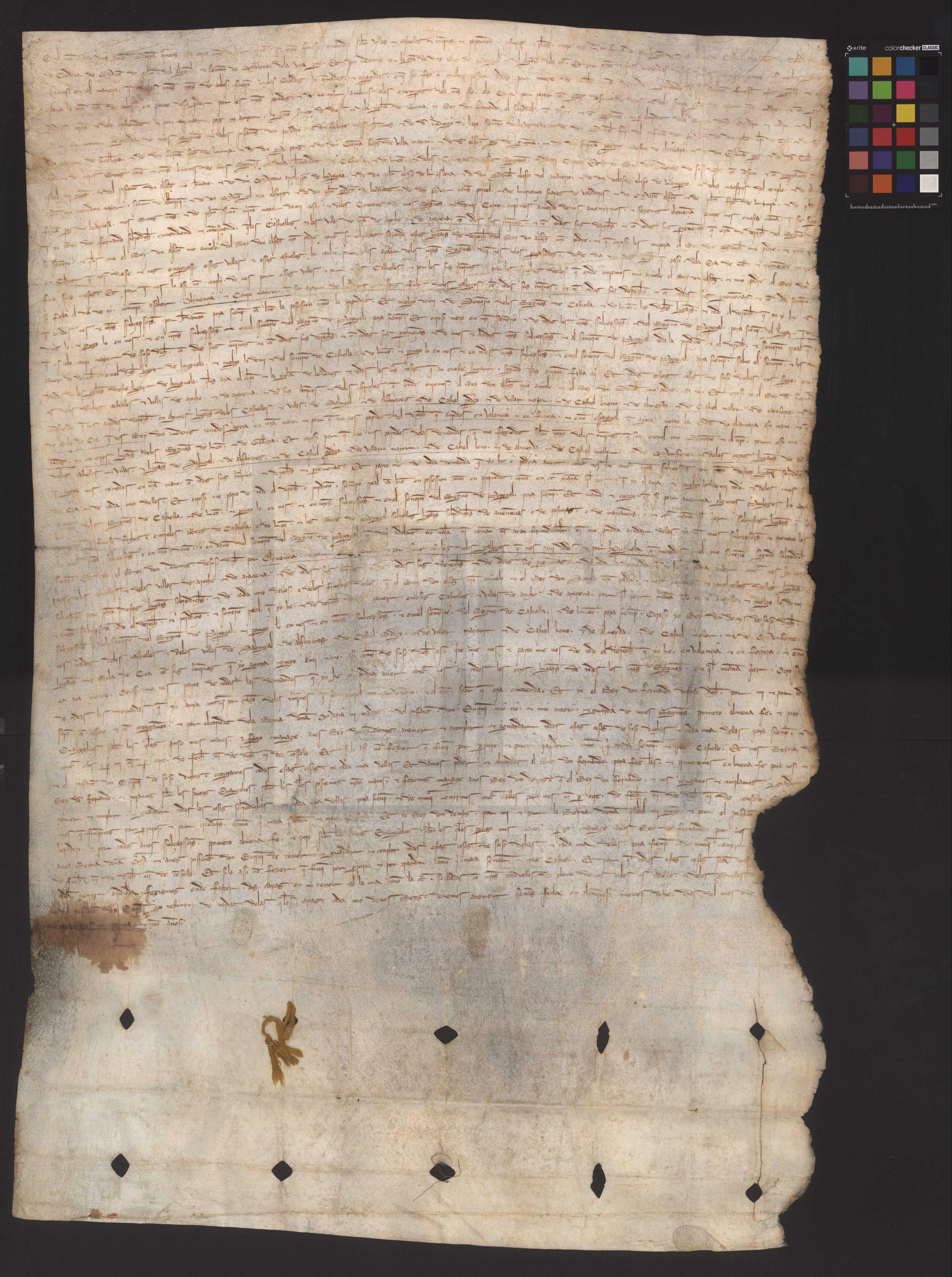
Treaty of Alcañices (1297), currently kept in the Torre do Tombo National Archive.

The Treaty of Alcañices (Note: Spanish: Tratado de Alcañices) or Treaty of Alcanises (Note: Portuguese: Tratado de Alcanises) was signed in Alcañices between King Denis of Portugal and King Fernando IV of Castile in 1297.

Denis was the grandson of King Alfonso X of Castile and essentially an administrator and not a warrior king. He went to war with the kingdom of Castile in 1295, relinquishing the villages of Serpa and Moura, but gained Olivença and reaffirmed Portugal's possession of the Algarve and defined the modern borders between the two Iberian countries. The treaty also established an alliance of friendship and mutual defense, leading to a peace of 40 years between the two nations.

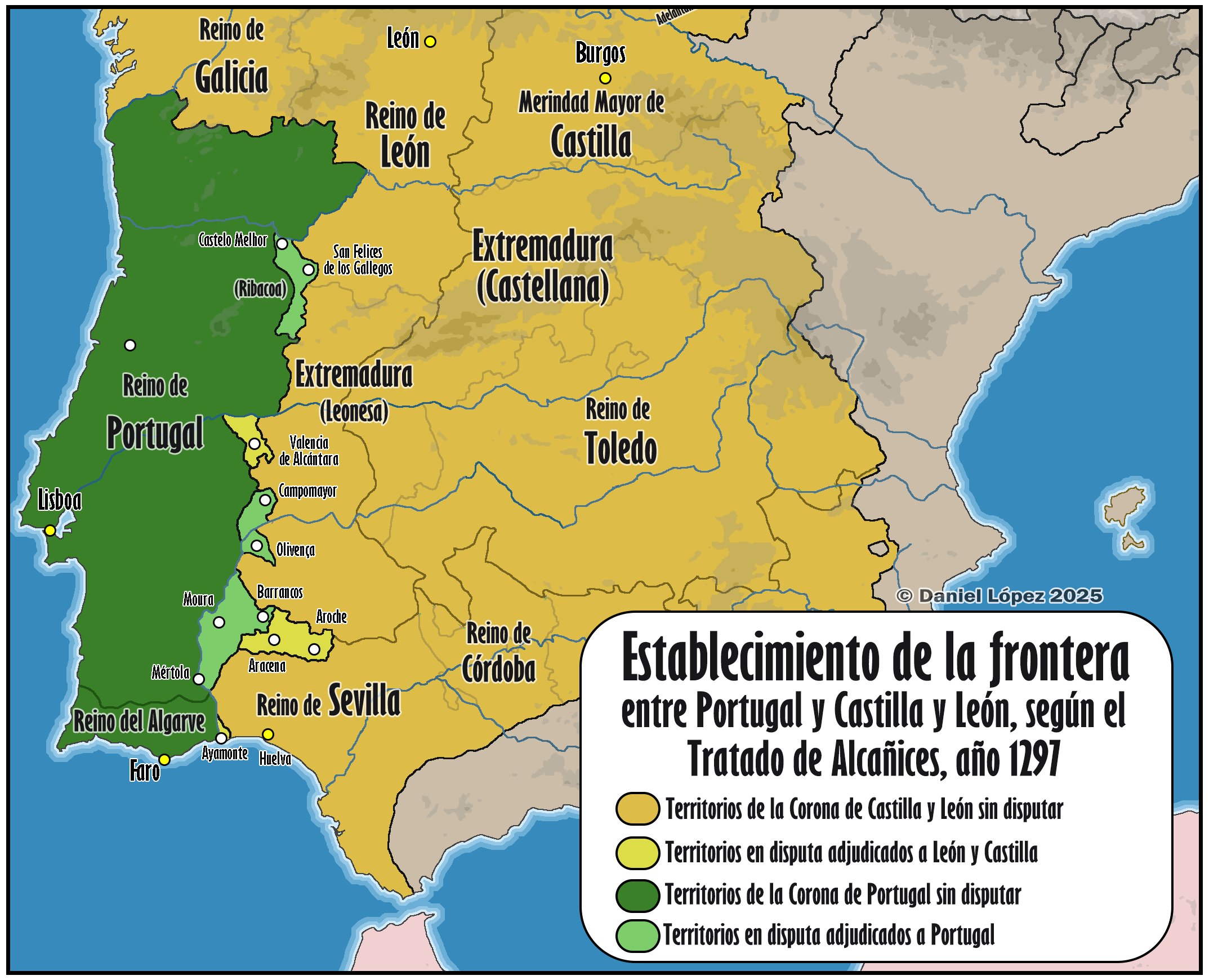
Map of the border agreed in the treaty and the fate of the disputed villages.

Fernando then married Denis's daughter, Infanta Constance of Portugal, making her Queen of Castile.

The only area still disputed is the village of Olivenza, which was under Portuguese sovereignty from 1297 to 1801, when it was occupied by Spain during the War of the Oranges and ceded that year under the Treaty of Badajoz, treaty which was declared null by Portugal during the Congress of Vienna. As of today, Spain controls the village.
