= Portugal–Spain border =

International border

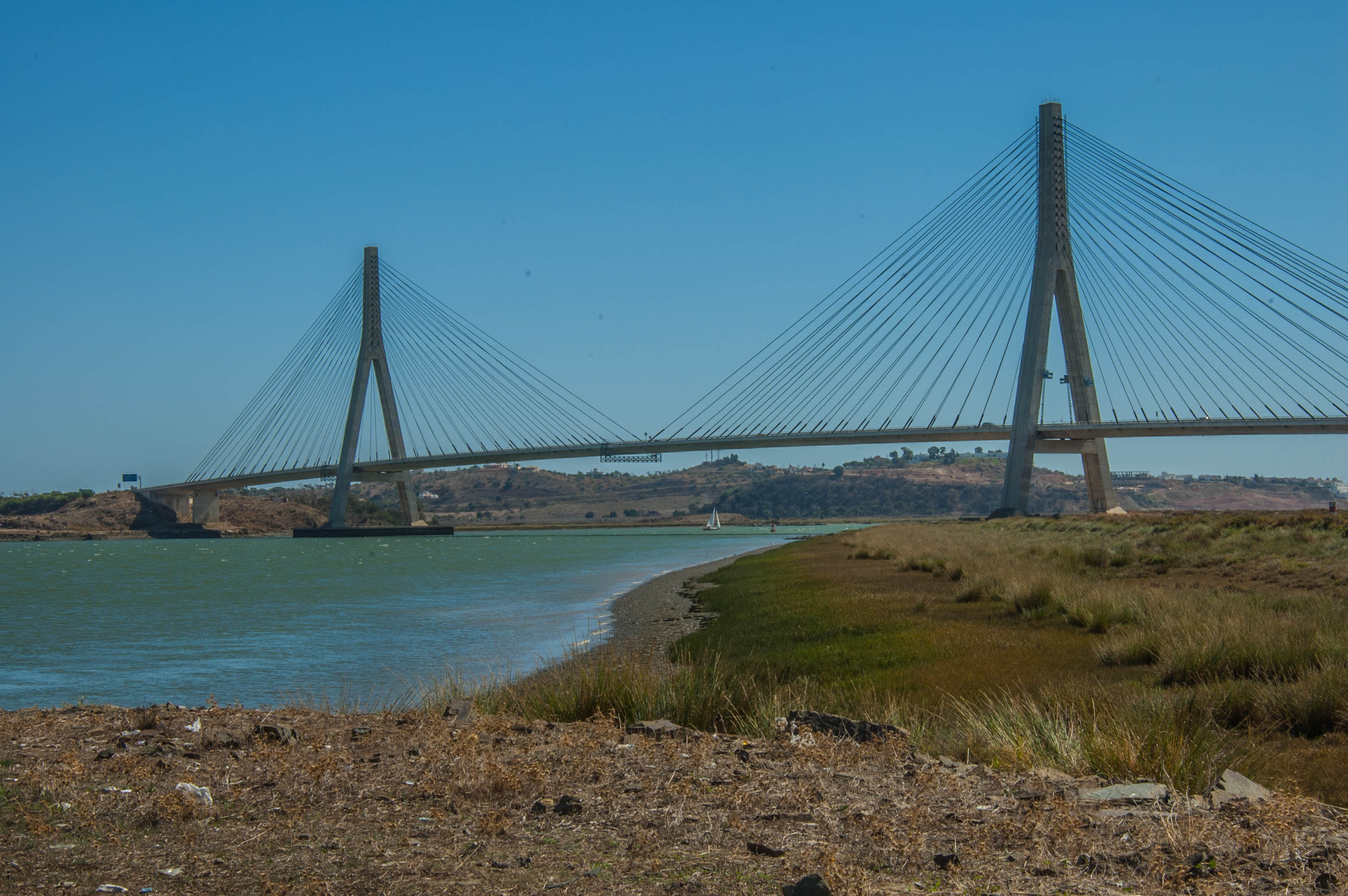
- Guadiana International Bridge, connecting Portugal and Spain

Characteristics
- Entities: Portugal Spain
- Length: 1234 km (de facto)

History
- Established: 1297; Treaty of Alcañices
- Treaties: Treaty of Badajoz (1267); Treaty of Alcañices (1297); Treaty of Badajoz (1801); Congress of Vienna (1815); Treaty of Lisbon (1864); Convention of Limits (1926)

The Portugal–Spain border, also known as "the Stripe", (Note: Spanish: La Raya, Portuguese: A Raia, Galician: A Raia, Mirandese: La Raia) is an international border between Portugal and Spain. It is 1,234 km (767 mi) long, making it the longest continuous international border within the European Union. The Portugal–Spain border was first defined in 1297 by the Treaty of Alcañices and has barely changed since then, which makes it one of the world's oldest international borders. As a member of the Schengen Area since 1995, the Portugal–Spain border is an open border. (Note: With a few temporary exceptions, such as in the 2020 lockdown caused by the COVID-19 pandemic.)

== History ==
The Treaty of Limits between Portugal and Spain was signed in Lisbon in 1864 and ratified in Madrid in 1866, leaving unsettled a southern stretch because of the Olivenza and the Moura strifes. A 1926 Convention of Limits ratified the southern end of the border, incorporating a 1893 agreement concerning Moura, while the lands of Olivenza were left without demarcation because of Portuguese reluctance to recognise Spanish sovereignty over the territory.

A number of treaties have been signed between Portugal and Spain to define the boundaries between the two countries:

- Treaty of Badajoz (1267) - Signed by king Alfonso X of Castile and King Afonso III of Portugal, establishing the Guadiana as roughly the southern border.
- Treaty of Alcañices (1297) - Signed by King Denis of Portugal (grandson of king Alfonso X of Castile) and King Ferdinand IV of Castile, Olivença is ceded to Portugal.
- Treaty of Badajoz (1801) - Olivença is ceded to Spain.
- Congress of Vienna (1815) - Spain promises to return Olivença to Portugal, leaving this area of the border disputed ever since.
- Treaty of Lisbon (1864) - This abolished the Couto Misto microstate, partitioning it between Spain and Portugal, while leaving the Olivenza sector unmapped due to the unresolved sovereignty dispute (see The undefined sector).
- Convention of Limits (1926) - Demarcating the border from the confluence of Ribeira de Cuncos with the Guadiana, just south of Olivença, to the estuary of the Guadiana River, on the far South.

=== The undefined sector (Markers 802 to 899) ===
Due to the unresolved status of the Olivenza dispute (see Claims of sovereignty), a specific stretch of the Portugal–Spain border remains officially undefined and unmarked on the ground. When the Mixed Boundary Commission (Comisión Mixta de Límites / Comissão Mista de Limites) was tasked with surveying and placing the stone border markers following 19th-century bilateral treaties, operations were suspended along this sector of the Guadiana River.

Consequently, the boundary markers numbered from 802 to 899 were never installed. This leaves the border line completely untraced between the confluence of the Caia River (near Olivenza) and the confluence of the Cuncos Stream (Ribeira de Cuncos) with the Guadiana River. Official maps produced by both nations' geographical and military institutes reflect this anomaly through unique cartographic asymmetries. While Spanish topographies apply an alternate styling along the river axis that lacks the standard boundary shading seen elsewhere, official Portuguese military charts completely omit the international boundary line in this specific sector.

== Customs and identity checks ==
Portugal and Spain signed the Schengen Agreement in June 1991. This came into effect on 26 March 1995, making Portugal and Spain part of the Schengen area, and thus their boundary became an open border.

Portugal has since reintroduced border checks several times along the border with Spain: during the UEFA Euro 2004 championships, during the NATO 2010 Lisbon summit, and during Pope Francis's visit to Fátima in May 2017.

On 16 March 2020, Portugal and Spain reintroduced border checks due to the COVID-19 pandemic, with most people unable to cross; cross-border workers and goods were allowed to pass. The checks were planned until 15 May 2020. They were initially extended until 15 June 2020 and eventually until 1 July 2020.

On 29 January 2021, Portugal closed the border with Spain due to the COVID-19 pandemic; only people with exceptional reasons (force majeure) were able to cross. The planned closure was expected to last for fourteen days, but this was extended to 1 March. The closure was further lengthened to 16 March 2021, then again to 5 April 2021. It was extended again to 15 April 2021 and then to 3 May 2021. This was eventually shortened to 1 May 2021.

=== Border crossing checkpoints ===
- Valença-Tui
- Vila Verde da Raia-Verín
- Quintanilha-San Vitero
- Vilar Formoso-Fuentes de Oñoro
- Termas de Monfortinho-Cilleros
- Marvão-Valencia de Alcántara
- Elvas-Badajoz
- Vila Verde de Ficalho-Rosal de la Frontera
- Vila Real de Santo António-Ayamonte

== Border crossings ==
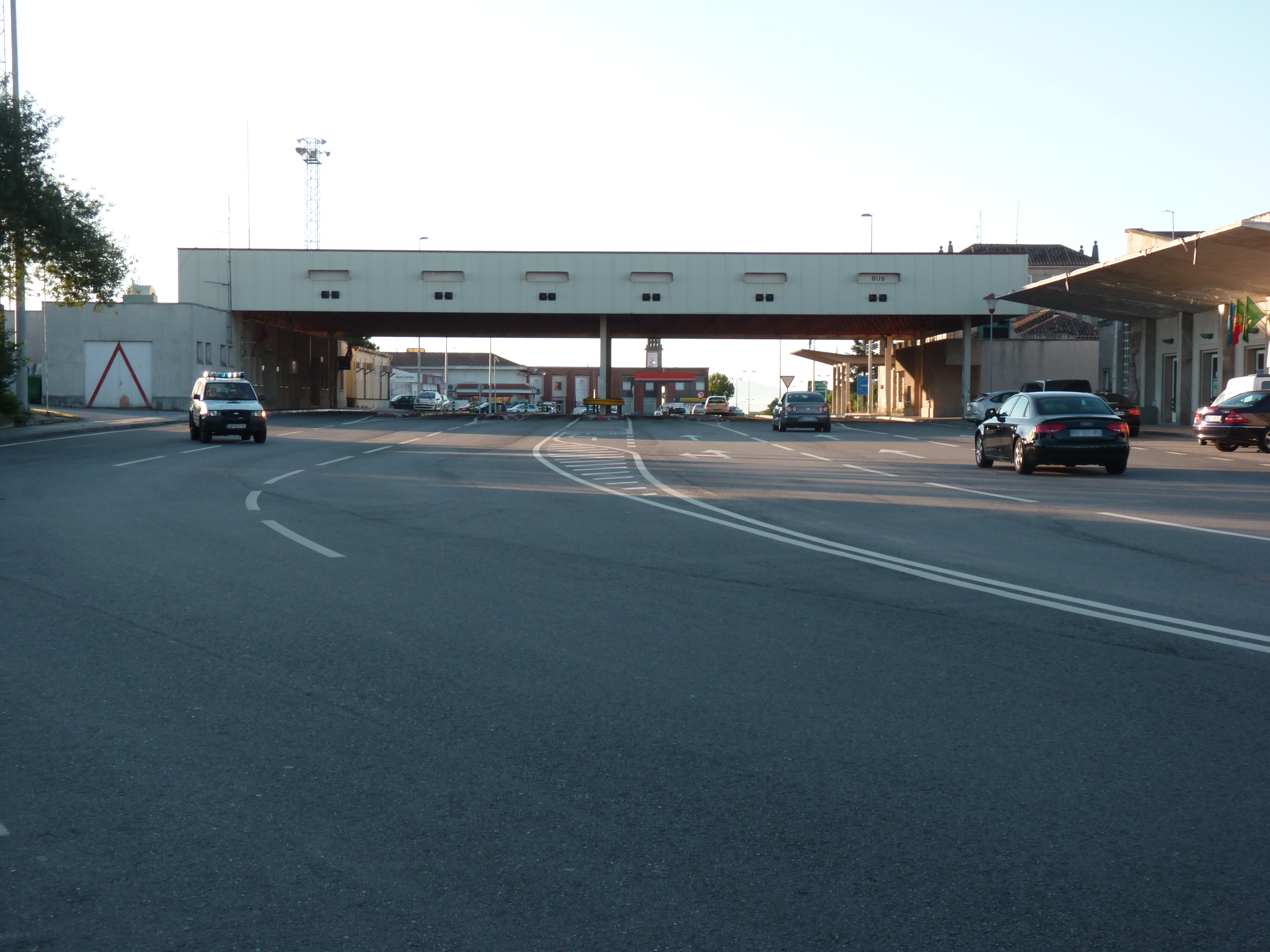
Vilar Formoso - Fuentes de Oñoro border crossing

The busiest crossing point between Portugal and Spain is Tui-Valença, with the main international bridge concentrating half of the total international road traffic between both countries. Other important crossings are Vilar Formoso - Fuentes de Oñoro, Caminha and Bragança to Galicia, Portalegre and Elvas to Badajoz, and Castro Marim and Vila Real de Santo António to Ayamonte.

Bridges across the border include the Guadiana International Bridge and the Lower Guadiana International bridge.

An international bridge connects the Portuguese village of Várzea Grande (Arronches municipality) with the Spanish village of El Marco (La Codosera municipality). It is a wooden bridge only 3.2 meters long.

A zipline across the border exists between Sanlucar de Guadiana in Spain and Alcoutim in Portugal; it is the first and currently only zip line over an international border.

A microstate existed previously on the border called Couto Misto.

== Bordering districts and provinces ==
Sign when entering Portugal from Spain.

Sign when entering Spain from Portugal.

Districts on the Portuguese side of the border from North to South:

- Viana do Castelo District (Northern Portugal)
- Braga District (Northern Portugal)
- Vila Real District (Northern Portugal)
- Bragança District (Northern Portugal)
- Guarda District (Central Portugal)
- Castelo Branco District (Central Portugal)
- Portalegre District (Alentejo)
- Évora District (Alentejo)
- Beja District (Alentejo)
- Faro District (Algarve)

Provinces on the Spanish side of the border from North to South:

- Province of Pontevedra ( Galicia)
- Province of Ourense ( Galicia)
- Province of Zamora ( Castile and León)
- Province of Salamanca ( Castile and León)
- Province of Cáceres ( Extremadura)
- Province of Badajoz ( Extremadura)
- Province of Huelva ( Andalusia)

== Maritime borders ==
Portugal's maritime border delimitation, also known as the Exclusive economic zone of Portugal has been disputed for a number of years by Spain, relatively to the Savage Islands area, between Madeira and the Canary Islands.
