= Guadiana (disambiguation) =

Guadiana may refer to:

- Guadiana, a river in southern Spain and Portugal
  - Ojos del Guadiana
  - Guadiana Valley Natural Park, a natural park in southeastern Portugal
  - Guadiana International Bridge
- Guadiana, Naranjito, Puerto Rico, a barrio of Naranjito, Puerto Rico
- Guadiana, Badajoz, a town and municipality in Extremadura, Spain (formerly Guadiana del Caudillo)
- Guadiana River (Puerto Rico), a river in Puerto Rico
- Guadiana Bay, a bay in western Cuba
- Ribera del Guadiana, a Spanish protected designation of origin (Denominación de Origen - DO) for wines in Extremadura
- Guadiana Trophy, an annual football (soccer) tournament hosted by Portugal and played in the pre-season
