= Sierra de Alcaraz (Vino de la Tierra) =

Sierra de Alcaraz was a Spanish geographical indication for Vino de la Tierra wines located in the autonomous region of Castilla–La Mancha. Vino de la Tierra is one step below the mainstream Denominación de Origen indication on the Spanish wine quality ladder.

The area covered by this geographical indication comprises the municipalities of Alcaraz, El Ballestero, El Bonillo, Povedilla, Robledo, and Viveros, located in the province of Albacete, in Castilla–La Mancha, Spain.

It acquired its Vino de la Tierra status in 2000,, but it is no longer listed.
