= Tagus =

Longest river on the Iberian Peninsula

Tagus Tajo (Spanish) Tejo (Portuguese)
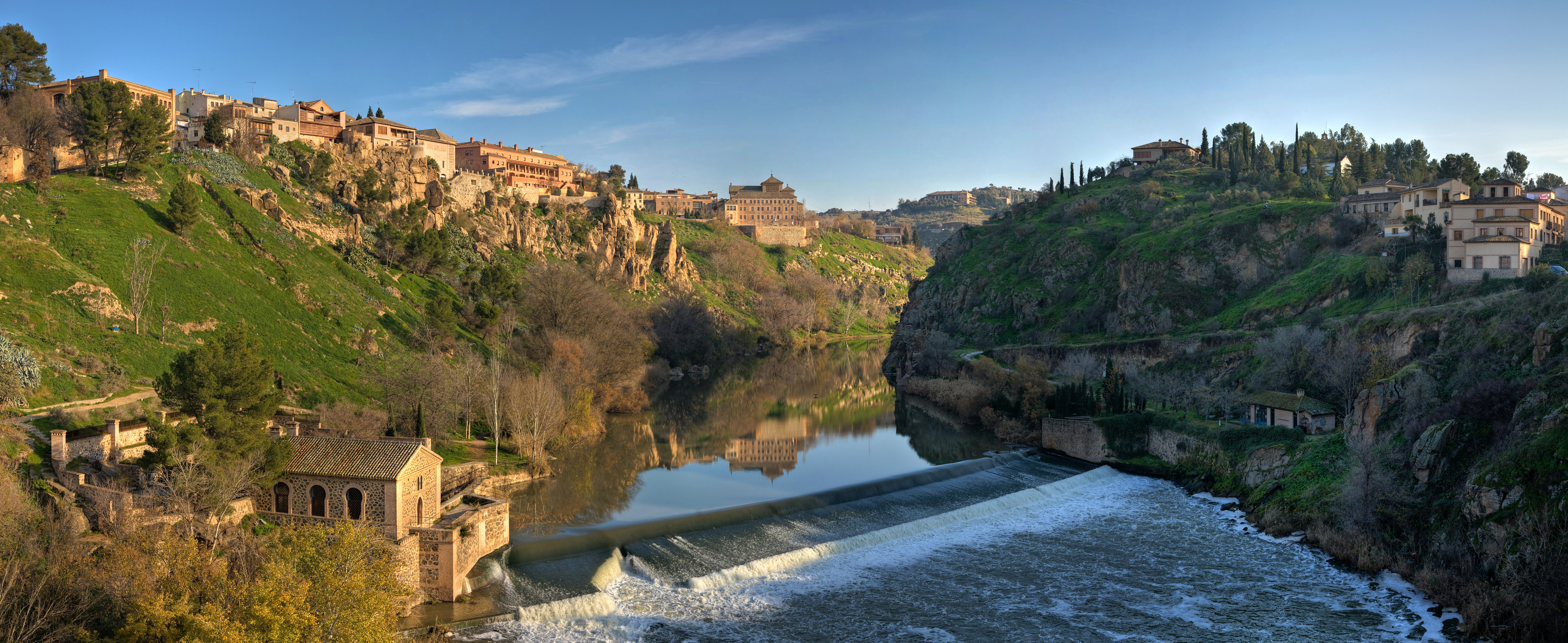
- View of Tagus River in Toledo, Spain

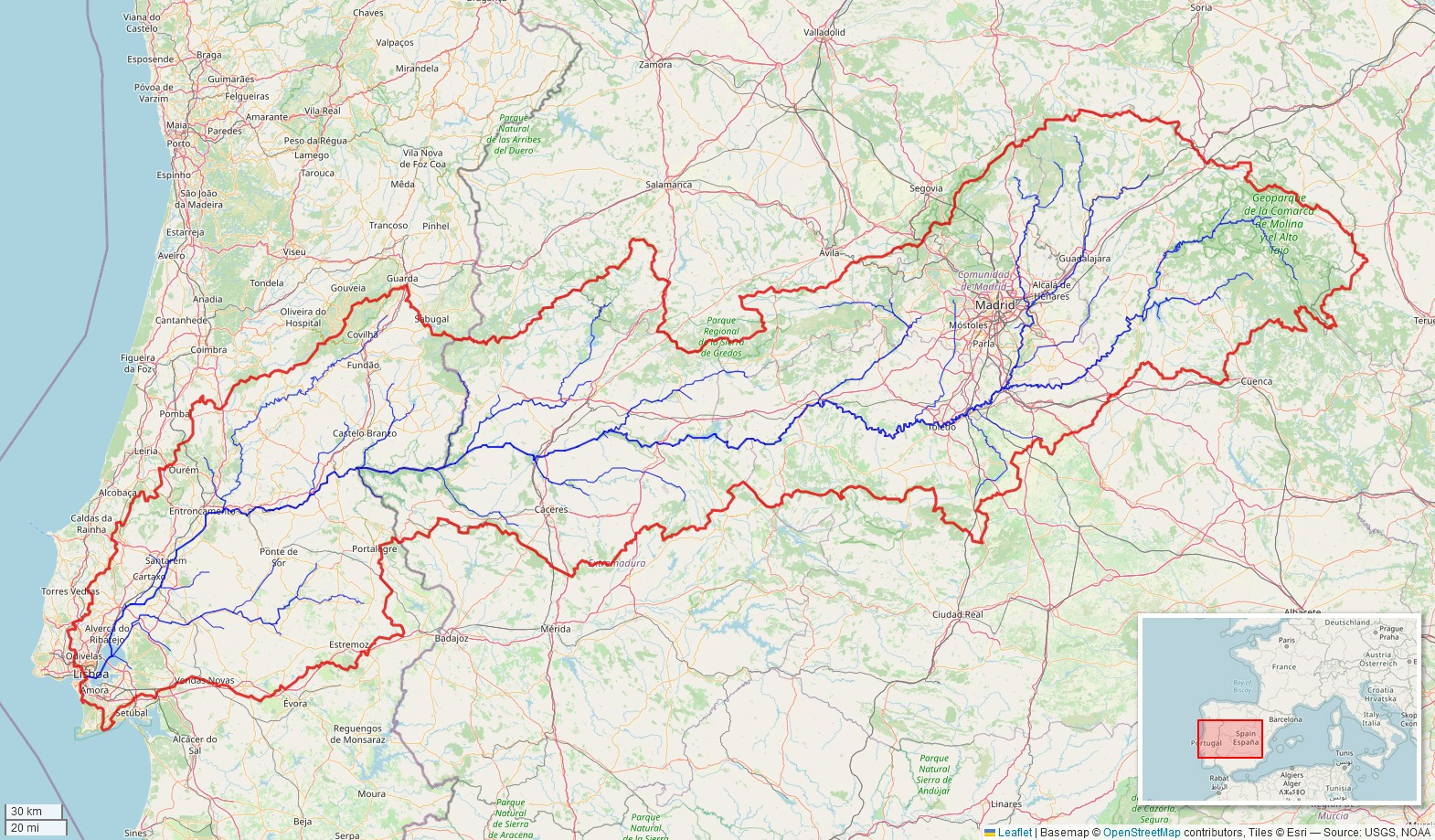
- Tagus River basin (Interactive map)
- Etymology: Vulgar Latin taliāre, "to cut through"

Location
- Country: Spain, Portugal

Physical characteristics
- Source: Fuente de García, Montes Universales
  - location: Frías de Albarracín, Spain
  - coordinates: 40°19′16″N 1°41′49″W
  - elevation: 1,593 m (5,226 ft)
- Mouth: Estuary of the Tagus, Atlantic Ocean
  - location: Lisbon, Portugal
  - coordinates: 38°41′28″N 9°10′16″W
  - elevation: 0 m (0 ft)
- Length: 1,007 km (626 mi)
- Basin size: 80,100 km^{2} (30,900 sq mi)
- Discharge
  - average: 500 m^{3}/s (18,000 cu ft/s)

Basin features
- Tributaries
  - left: Guadiela, Algodor, Gévalo, Ibor, Almonte, Salor, Sever
  - right: Gallo, Jarama, Guadarrama, Alberche, Tiétar, Alagón, Zêzere

The Tagus (/ˈteɪɡəs/ TAY-gəs; Spanish: Tajo [ˈtaxo]; Portuguese: Tejo [ˈtɛʒu]) is the longest river in the Iberian Peninsula. The river rises in the Montes Universales between Cuenca and Teruel, in mid-eastern Spain, flows 1,007 km (626 mi), generally westward, and empties into the Atlantic Ocean at Lisbon.

== Name ==
The river's Latin name is Tagus. While the etymology is unclear, the most probable etymological origin for the hydronym Tagus is Indo-European *(s)tag- ('to drip').

== Geography ==
=== Source ===
The Tagus River originates at an elevation of 1,593 meters above sea level in a place known as Fuente García, within the municipality of Frías de Albarracín in Teruel, Spain. Its source is located between the Muela de San Juan (1,830 m) and Cerro de San Felipe (1,839 m), in the Sierra de Albarracín, which belongs to the Montes Universales in the western branch of the Iberian System.

=== Course ===
The river flows through Spain for 816 km (507 mi), passing through four autonomous communities (Aragón, Castilla-La Mancha, Madrid, and Extremadura) and a total of six provinces (Teruel, Guadalajara, Cuenca, Madrid, Toledo, and Cáceres). After forming a 47 km (29 mi) border between Spain and Portugal, it enters Portugal. In Portugal, it flows for 145 km (90 mi) through the traditional regions of Beira Baixa, Alto Alentejo, Ribatejo, and Estremadura, which include the districts of Castelo Branco, Portalegre, Santarém, Lisbon, and Setúbal.

The most important cities along its course are Aranjuez, Toledo, and Talavera de la Reina in Spain; and Abrantes, Santarém, and Lisbon in Portugal.

=== Basin ===
The Tagus basin has a total area of 80,600 km^{2} (31,100 sq mi). It is the most populated basin in the Iberian Peninsula, with more than ten million inhabitants. It includes the Madrid metropolitan area and the Lisbon region. The Tagus basin has a total reservoir capacity of around 14,500 hm^{3} (510 billion cu ft).

=== Geology ===
The lower Tagus region in Portugal is a seismically active area. Major earthquakes in the Lower Tagus include those of 1309, 1531, 1755, and 1909.

=== Estuary ===
The Tagus river is one of the few rivers in the world to have an inverted delta. Its delta is wider at the beginning and narrows down as it approaches the sea, contrary to a typical delta. This is because it flows into the sea through a small opening in a valley. Although due to sedimentation, this delta is now only very partially inverted, with the valley now mostly filled with sediment. The delta is about 15 km (9 mi) wide and 25 km (16 mi) long, but its exit into the sea is only 2 km (1.2 mi) wide. It thus forms a large lagoon with large and very shallow sand banks which go uncovered during low tides. The delta used to be even bigger thousands of years ago.

== Hydrology ==
The hydrological regime of the Tagus is determined by the rain and snow variations typical of the central region of the Iberian Peninsula, especially in reference to the mountain formations integrated here. The river's major floods usually occur from January to April, with an absolute maximum in March (when thawing occurs), while the lowest flows occur between July and October, with a minimum in September.

This results in a very irregular course, with strong flow oscillations. As it passes through Alcántara (Cáceres), these range from 350 m^{3}/s (12,000 cu ft/s) in February and March to 11 m^{3}/s (390 cu ft/s) in August and September.

This regime has been altered in the second half of the 20th century as a result of the construction of different engineering works, aimed at regulating its basin for five main uses: drinking water supply, irrigation, water diversion to an external basin (that of the Segura River), electricity production, and cooling of nuclear power plants.

== Ecology ==
The banks and areas of influence of the Tagus are home to relevant flora and fauna, representative of the central region of the Iberian Peninsula. The high degree of depopulation in some areas integrated into its basin, such as its upper and middle-lower course, has allowed the preservation of places of great ecological interest. Some of them have been legally protected, such as the Alto Tajo Nature Park (Guadalajara and Cuenca), the Monfragüe National Park (Cáceres), and the Tagus Estuary Natural Reserve, near Lisbon. Around the course of the river, four endangered animal species live: the Iberian lynx, the Spanish imperial eagle, the black stork, and the black vulture.

== Historical importance ==
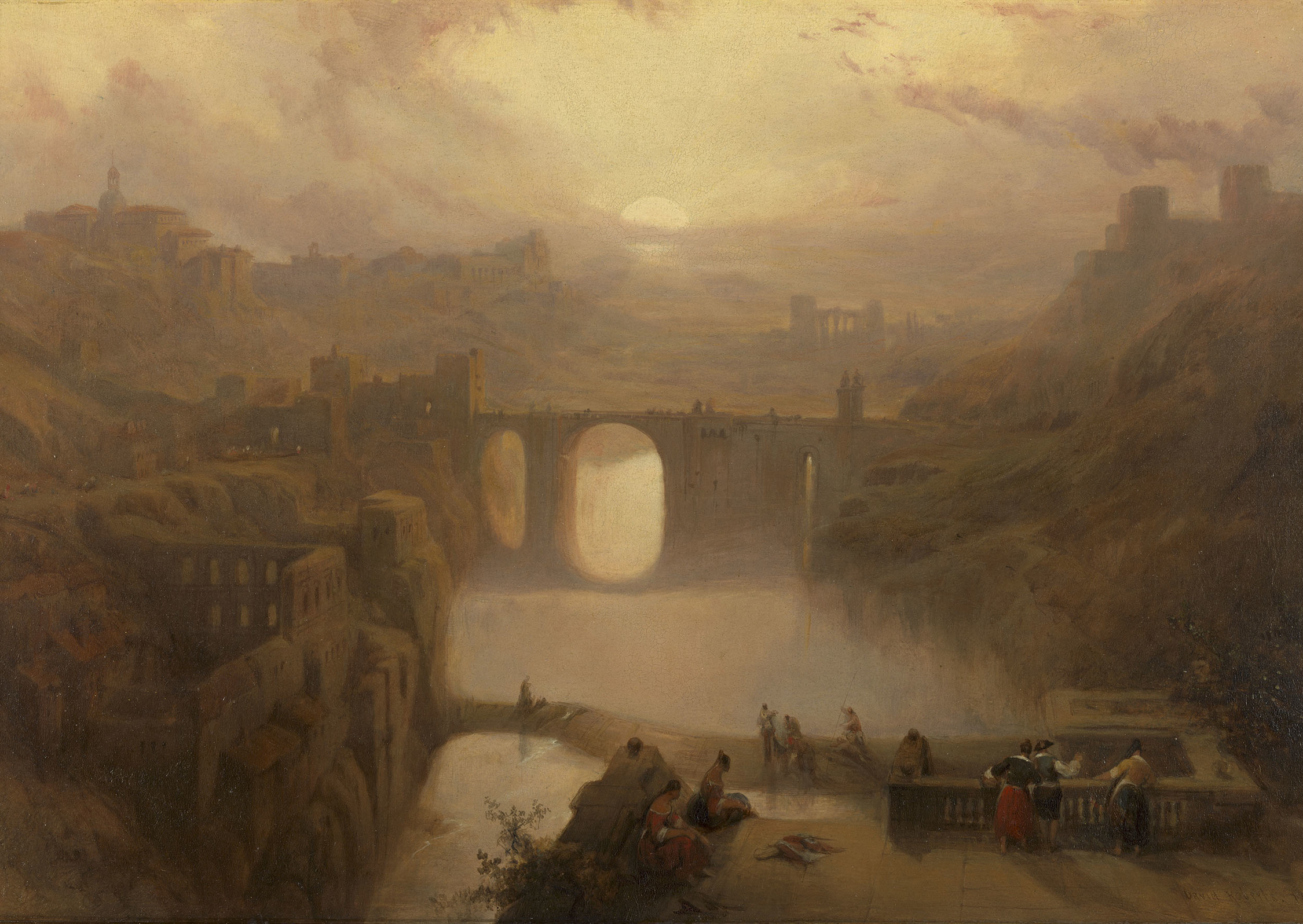
A View of Toledo and the River Tagus by David Roberts, 1841

In addition to its geographical relevance, the Tagus has great historical importance, resulting from its connection with Toledo and Lisbon, two of the cities with the greatest weight and historical journey in the Iberian Peninsula. The first was built on a hill about 100 m high, around the meander known as Torno del Tajo, which preserved it from possible attacks and incursions.

From the Late Middle Ages, the mouth of the Tagus articulated an intense commercial activity between Northern Europe and the Mediterranean. From the Renaissance, it was the main communications hub of the Portuguese Empire, which extended through America, Africa, and Asia.

== Recreational uses ==
The nearly 100 km (60 mi) of the Alto Tajo canyon as it passes through the natural park of the same name offer one of the best options for practicing whitewater canoeing in the central peninsula. Several adventure companies offer this activity in the vicinity of Poveda de la Sierra and Ocentejo. In the flat water modality, canoeing can be practiced in the Entrepeñas and Bolarque reservoirs. There are also important flat water canoeing clubs in Aranjuez and Talavera de la Reina.

== See also ==
- Tagus basin
- Rivers of Spain
