= Guadiana Valley Natural Park =

Protected area in Portugal

- IUCN category V (protected landscape/seascape)
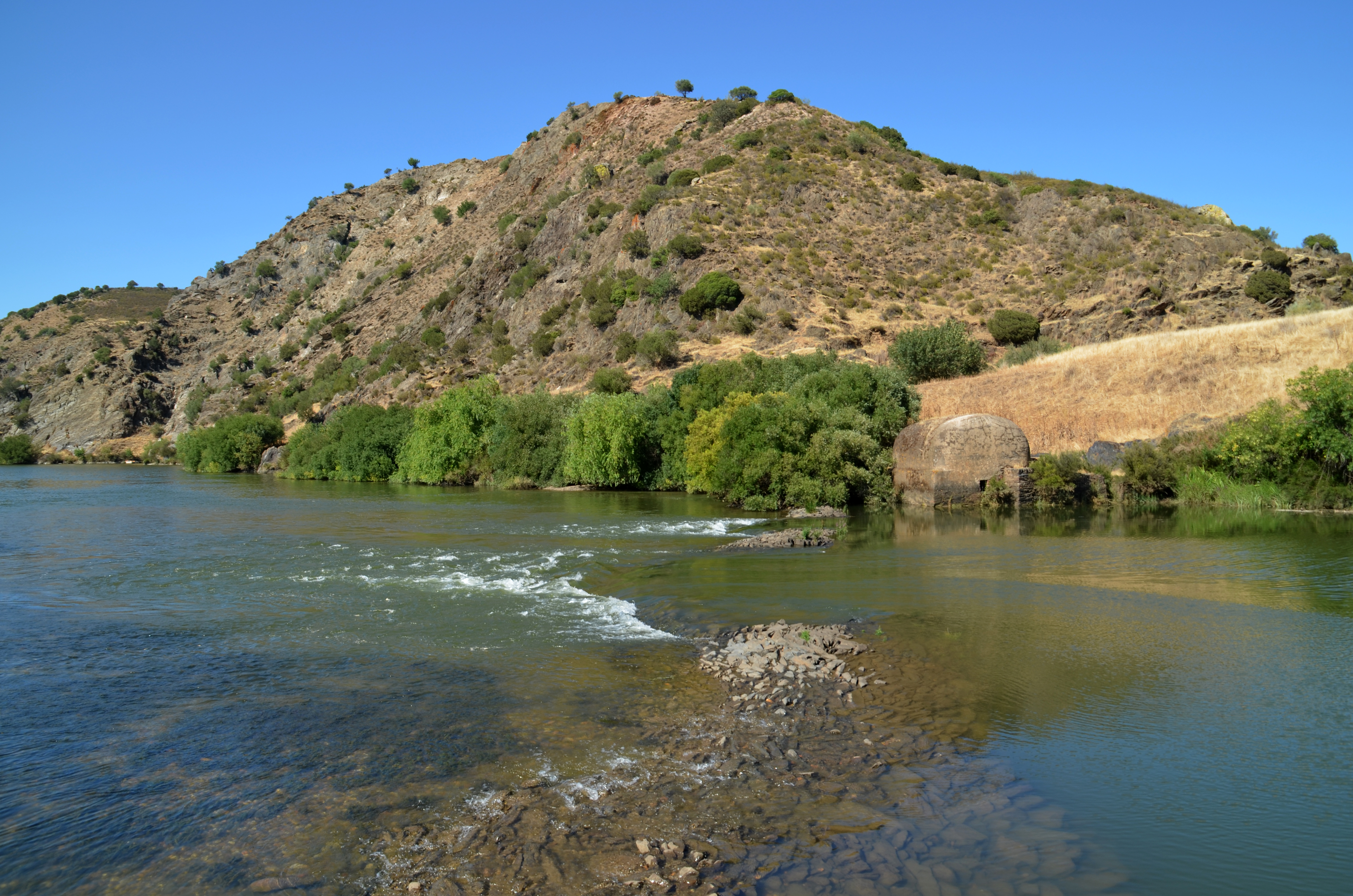
- Interactive map of Guadiana Valley Natural Park
- Location: Distrito de Beja
- Nearest city: Mértola, Serpa
- Coordinates: 37°39′02″N 7°38′42″W
- Area: 697 km^{2} (269 sq mi)
- Established: 18 November 1995
- Governing body: Institute for Nature Conservation and Forests

Guadiana Valley Natural Park (Portuguese: Parque Natural do Vale do Guadiana) is a natural park in southeastern Portugal. It is one of the 30 areas which are officially under protection in the country.

The top of the flow gage tower was reached by the Guadiana twice in 50 years.

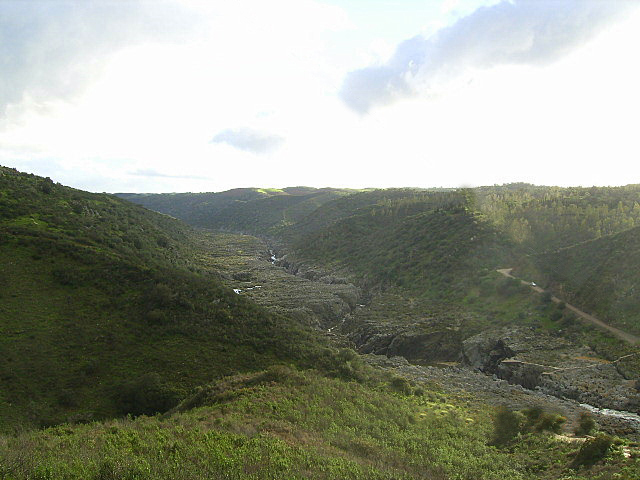
Pulo do Lobo (Wolf's Leap) is a waterfall in the Guadiana river, in the Guadiana Valley Natural Park.

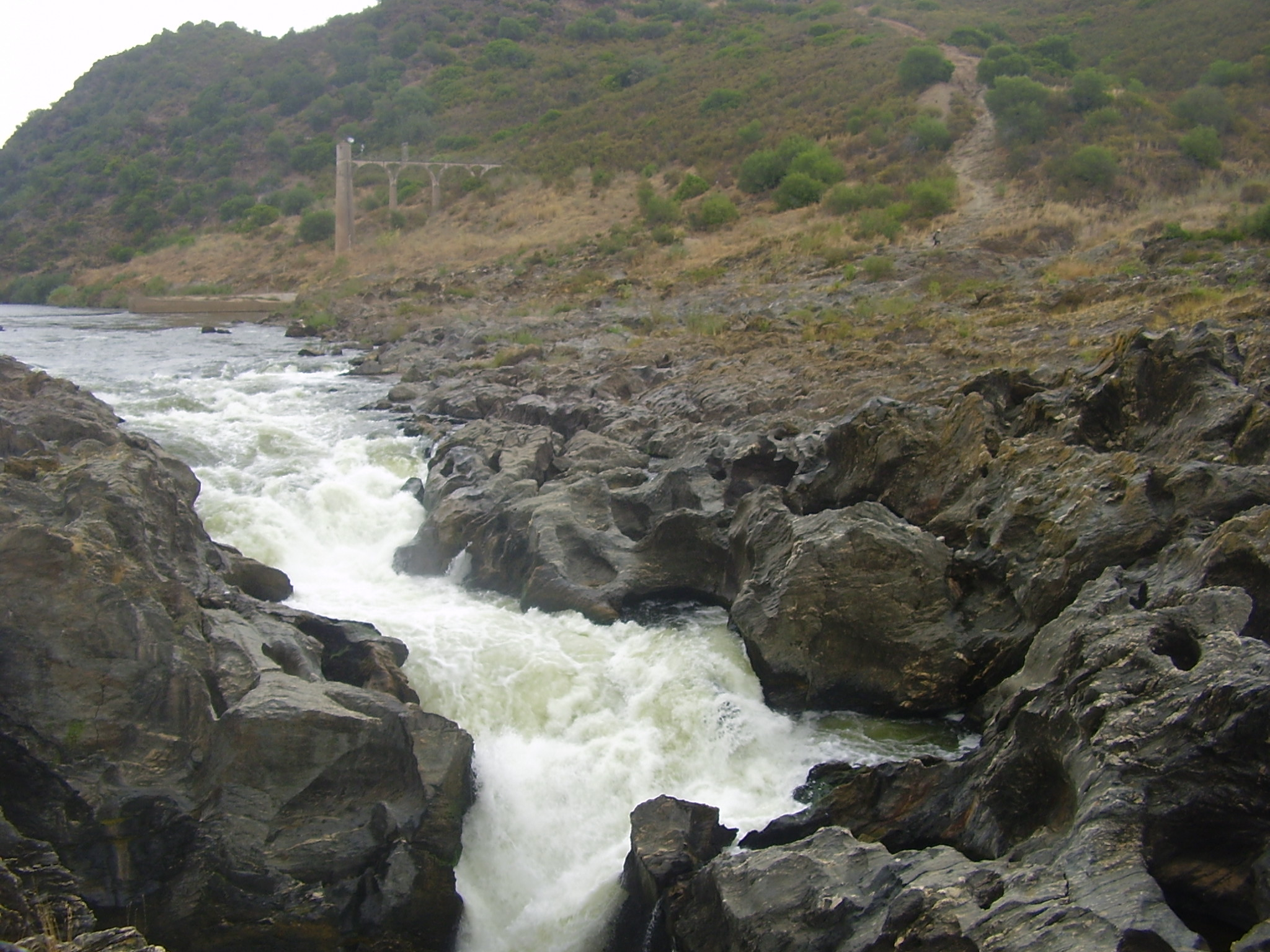
Pulo do Lobo, flow gage tower

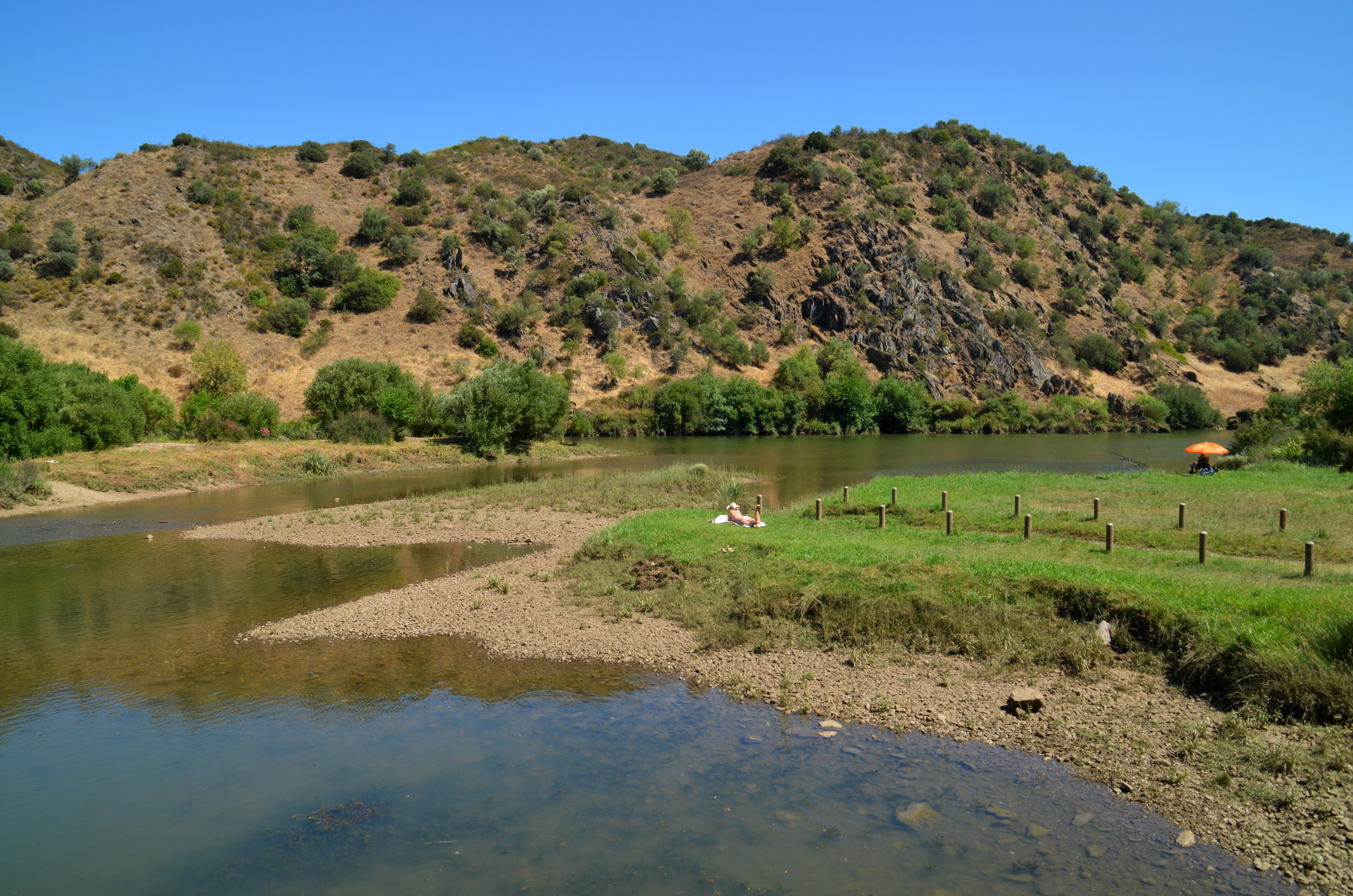
