= Matachel River =

River in Spain

Coordinates: 38°49′56″N 6°16′48″W

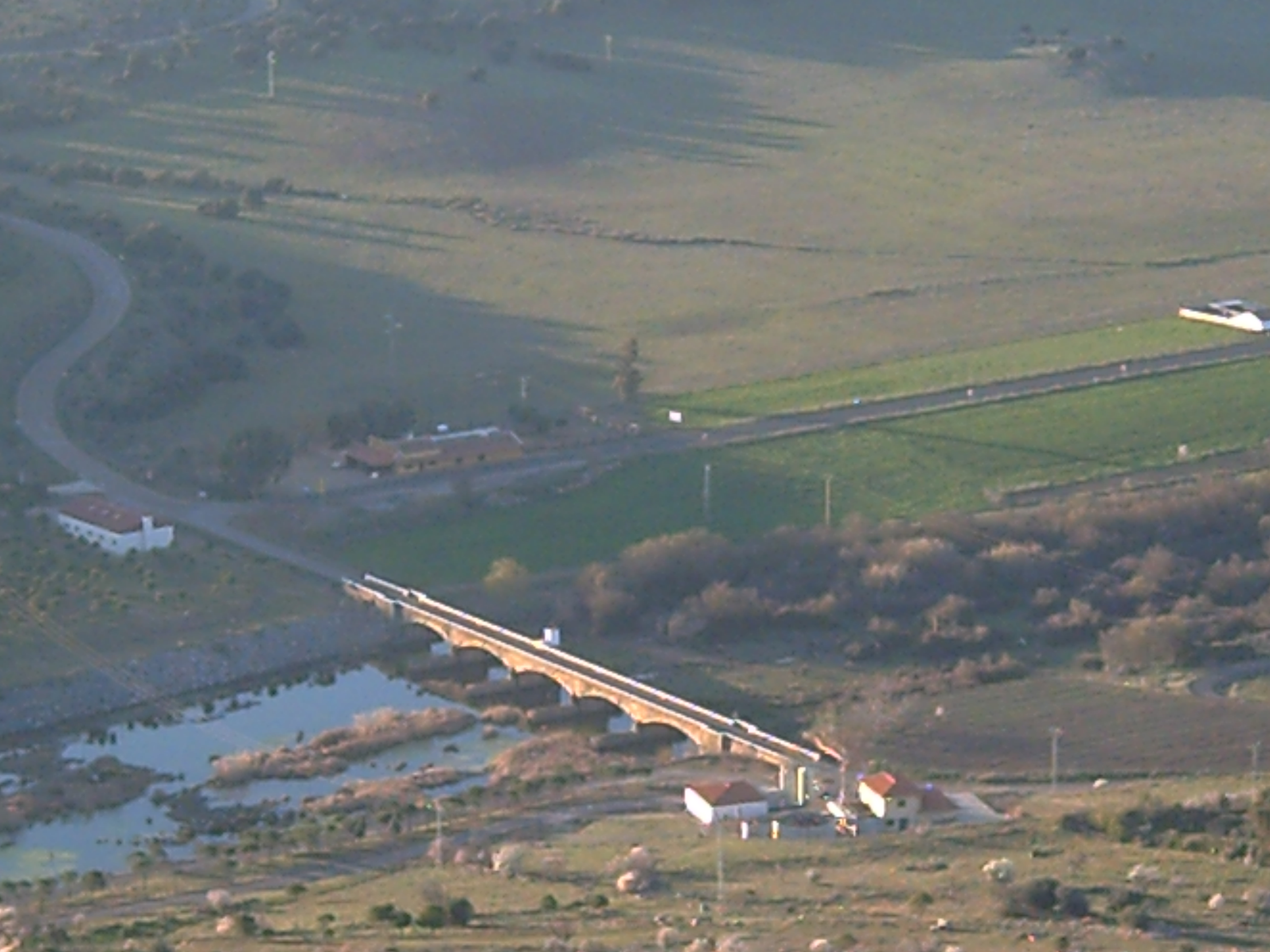
View of the Matachel River from Alanhi Castle

The Matachel River is a river in Extremadura in central Spain, one of the most important tributaries of the Guadiana River. Its basin represents 3.8% of the Guadiana basin.

The Matachel rises in the Cortijo del Bruto, near Azuaga, in the Sierra Morena. From its source to its mouth in the vicinity of the town of Don Álvaro, the Matachel bisects the province of Badajoz. In its final stretch its course is regulated by the Alange Dam.
