= Extremadura =

Autonomous community of Spain

- Autonomous community
- Flag Coat of arms
- Anthem: "Himno de Extremadura" "Anthem of Extremadura"
- Location of Extremadura within Spain
- Interactive map of Extremadura
- Coordinates: 39°N 6°W
- Country: Spain
- Capital: Mérida
- Largest city: Badajoz
- Provinces: Cáceres, and Badajoz

Government
  - Type: Devolved government in a constitutional monarchy
  - Body: Junta de Extremadura
  - President: María Guardiola (PP)
  - Legislature: Assembly of Extremadura

Area
  - Total: 41,633.60 km^{2} (16,074.82 sq mi)
  - Rank: 5th in Spain
- 8.2% of Spain

Population (2025)
  - Total: 1,053,345
  - Rank: 13th in Spain
  - Density: 25.30036/km^{2} (65.52763/sq mi)
- 2.1% of Spain
- Demonyms: Extremaduran, Extremenian extremeño (m), extremeña (f)

GDP
  - Total: €26.574 billion (2024)
  - Per capita: €25,246 (2024)
- Time zone: UTC+1 (CET)
  - Summer (DST): UTC+2 (CEST)
- ISO 3166 code: ES-EX
- Statute of Autonomy: 26 February 1983
- Official languages: Spanish
- Other languages: Extremaduran, Fala, Portuguese (including Oliventine Portuguese)
- Congress: 10 deputies (out of 350)
- Senate: 10 senators (out of 265)
- HDI (2025): 0.876 very high · 17th
- Website: www.juntaex.es

Extremadura (/ˌɛkstrəməˈdjʊərə/ EK-strə-mə-DURE-ə; Spanish: [e(ɣ)stɾemaˈðuɾa]; Extremaduran: Estremaúra [ehtːɾemaˈuɾa]; Portuguese: Estremadura; Fala: Extremaúra) is a landlocked autonomous community of Spain. Its capital city is Mérida, and its largest city is Badajoz.

Located in the central-western part of the Iberian Peninsula, it is crossed from east to west by the Tagus and Guadiana rivers. The autonomous community is formed by the two largest provinces of Spain: Cáceres and Badajoz. Extremadura is bordered by Portugal to the west and by the autonomous communities of Castile and León to the north, Castilla–La Mancha to the east, and Andalusia to the south.

Extremadura is the 13th most populous autonomous community of Spain with a population of 1,053,345 as of 2025, however, with an area of 41,633.60 square kilometres (16,074.82 sq mi), it has the lowest population density at 25.3 inhabitants per square kilometre.

It is an important area for wildlife, particularly with the major reserve at Monfragüe, which was designated a National Park in 2007, and the International Tagus River Natural Park (Parque Natural Tajo Internacional). The regional government is led by the president of the Regional Government of Extremadura, a post currently held by María Guardiola of the People's Party.

The Day of Extremadura is celebrated on 8 September. It coincides with the Catholic festivity of Our Lady of Guadalupe. The region, featuring an enormous energy surplus and hosting lithium deposits, is at the forefront of Spain's plans for energy transition and decarbonisation.

== Etymology ==
The two most common views on the origin of the name are:

1. It refers to the areas surrounding the south of the river Duero, from Latin Extrema Dorii;
2. Perhaps simply being formed from extremo ('extreme') plus the common Spanish suffix -dura referring to the outer regions of the kingdoms of León and Castilla.

== History ==
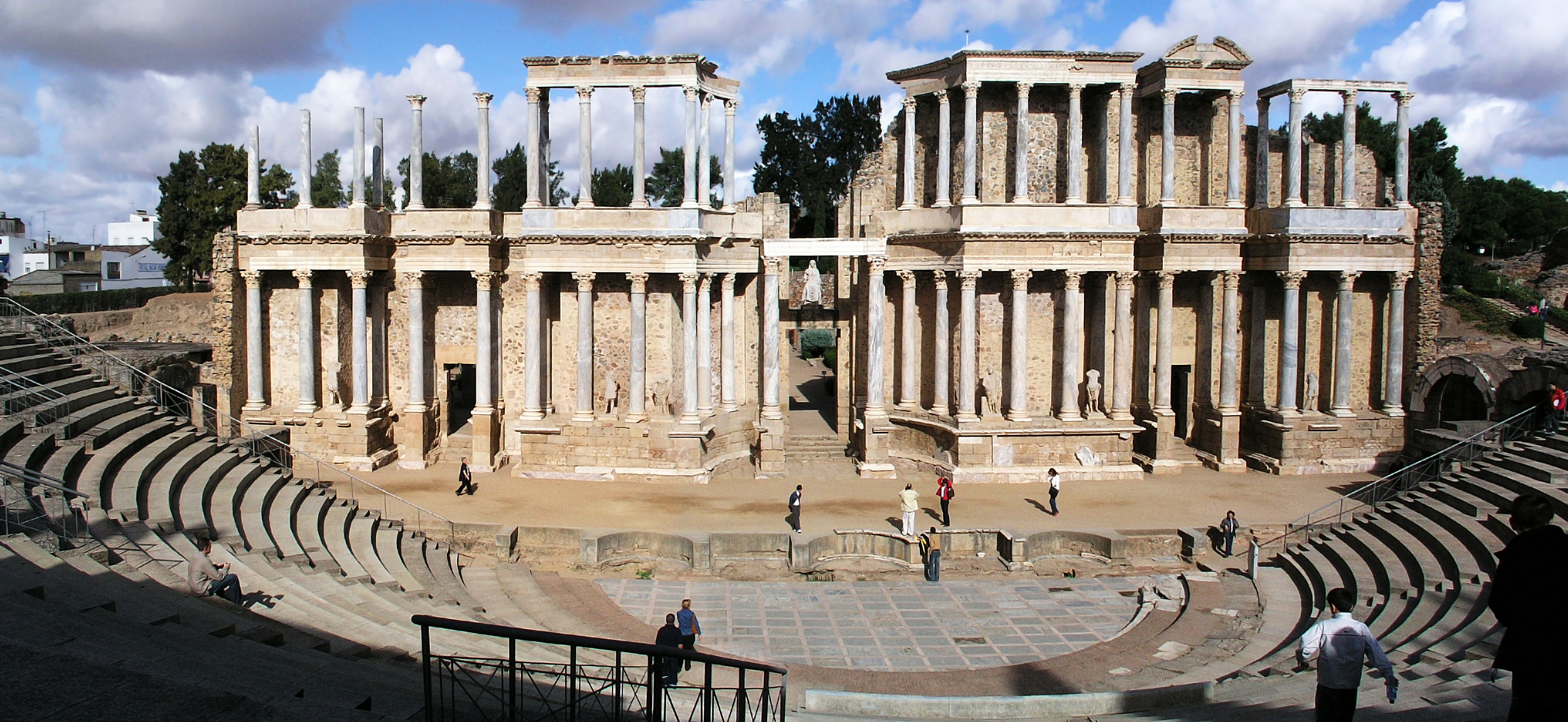
Archaeological Roman Ensemble in Mérida (Emerita Augusta), capital of the Roman province of Hispania Lusitana.

During the time of the Roman Empire, the area that is known today as Autonomous Community of Extremadura was part of Lusitania, a Roman province that included most of current day Portugal (except for the northern area today known as Norte Region) and the central western portion of the current day Spain. Mérida (now capital of Extremadura) became the capital of the Roman province of Lusitania, and one of the most important cities in the Roman Empire.

Like the bulk of the Iberian Peninsula, the territory was conquered by the Umayyads in the early 8th century. As part of the Emirate and later Caliphate of Córdoba, it largely constituted a territorial subdivision (kūra) of the former polities centered on Mérida. Following the collapse of the Caliphate in the early 11th century during the so-called Fitna of al-Andalus and its ensuing fragmentation into ephemeral statelets (taifas), the bulk of the territory of current day Extremadura became part of the (First) Taifa of Badajoz (Baṭalyaws), centered around the namesake city and founded by Sapur, a saqaliba previously freed by Al-Hakam II.

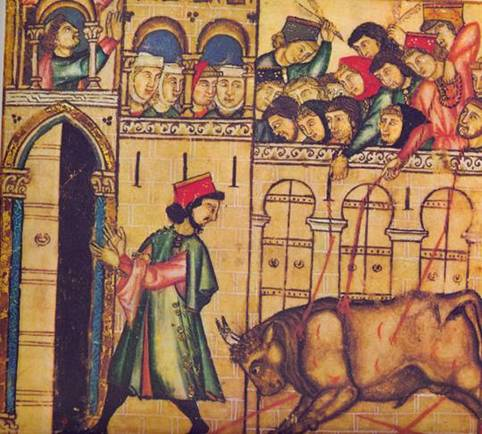
The bull of Plasencia in the Cantigas de Santa Maria.

Conversely, the kingdoms of León, Castile and Portugal (most notably the first one) made advances in the 11th and 12th centuries across the territory (with for example the successive Leonese conquests of Coria in 1079 and 1142, the Portuguese attempts at expanding across the Guadiana basin in the second half of the 12th century, or the Castilian founding of Plasencia in 1186) not free from setbacks either caused by the Almoravid and Almohad impetus, which also entailed the demise of the first and second taifa of Badajoz in 1094 and 1150, respectively. In the Almohad case, their 1174 offensive removed Leonese control from every fortress south of the Tagus (including Cáceres). After the Almohad disaster at the 1212 Battle of Las Navas de Tolosa, the remaining part of current-day Extremadura under Muslim control fell to the troops led by Alfonso IX of León—Alcántara (1214), Cáceres (1227–1229), Mérida (1230), Badajoz (1230)—and later to the military orders of Santiago and Alcántara—Trujillo (1232), Medellín (1234)—on behalf of Ferdinand III of Castile. The last fortresses in the Lower Extremadura were conquered by Christians by 1248.

By the late Middle Ages, the territory of the current-day region consisted of mayorazgos of the military orders of Santiago and Alcántara (about half the territory), nobiliary lordships (about a quarter of the territory) and royal demesne towns (the other quarter of the territory).

In between the 15th and 16th centuries, the concept of the Leonese and Castilian extremaduras diluted and the name eventually came to refer to the territory of the current-day region. The territory lacked nonetheless shared government and administration institutions.

In between 1570 and 1572, the Crown forcibly relocated about 11,000 moriscos into the territory as part of the deportation of Granadans that followed the defeat of the Alpujarras revolt. The distribution was somewhat chaotic although some places with an already "threatening" population of old moriscos (such as Hornachos, Magacela and Benquerencia) were avoided as resettlement locations for the Granadan moriscos.

Two generations later, the expulsion of the moriscos from the region began in 1609, starting with the moriscos of Hornachos, the first expulsion in the Crown of Castile. By September 1610 about two thirds of the moriscos of Extremadura had been already expelled and by 1611 the number amounted to 12,776. Those who avoided the early orders of expulsion abided to reports of being 'good Christians' or claimed a status as 'old moriscos'. At the height of 1612, there were reports of remaining moriscos in Trujillo, Mérida and Plasencia.

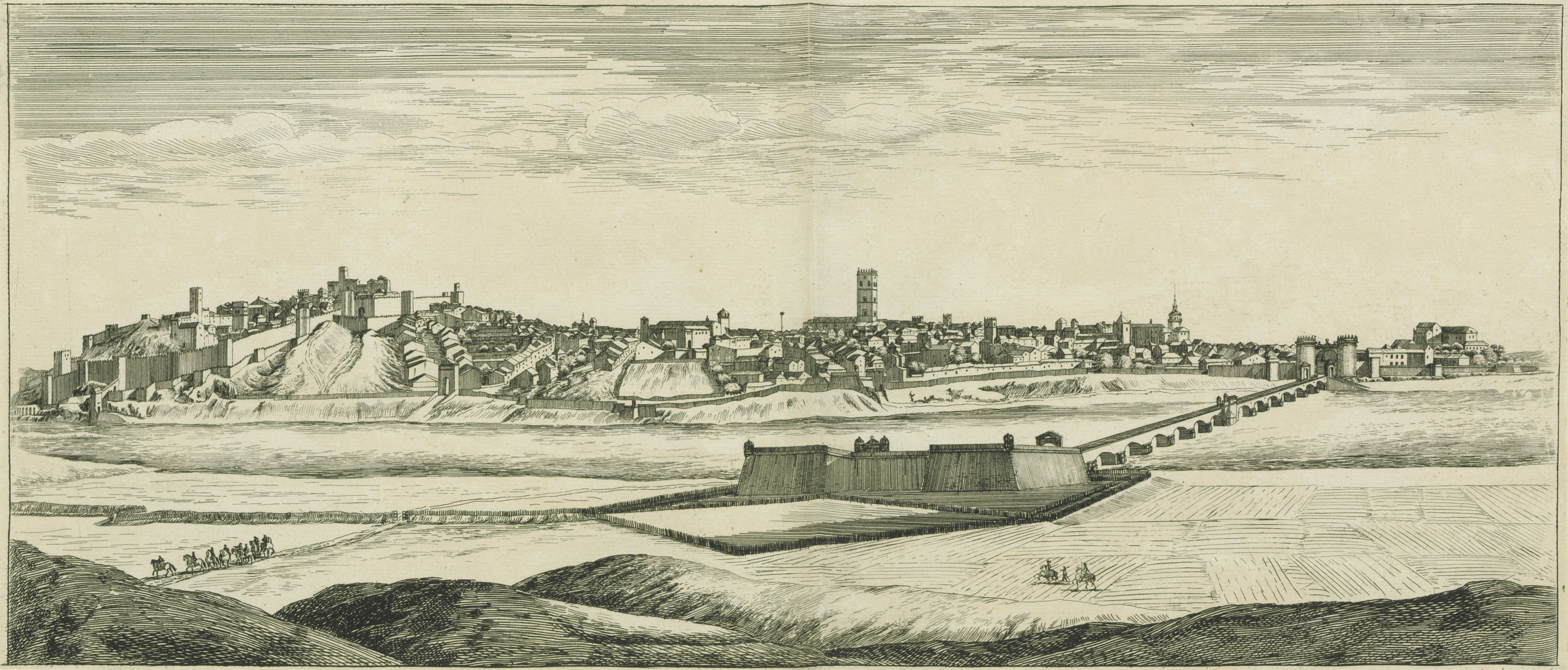
17th century panorama of the city of Badajoz.

Located in the most convenient path from the Meseta Central to Portugal, the territory suffered greatly due to warfare from the 1640–1668 Portuguese Restoration War, characterised not by the movement of large armies but by pillage, skirmishes, raids, and destruction of economic resources and settlements across both sides of the Raya. The growing role of the fortified place of Badajoz (halfway between Lisbon and Madrid), in the wake of the installment of the Captaincy General of Extremadura consolidated the clout of the military in the region.

By the late 18th century, the Extremaduran countryside languished, experiencing a deep crisis. There was a diminishing share of land dedicated to crops. The growing cattle sector induced the creation of yet more pastures, adding up to the structural problem stemmed from the extraordinary degree of concentration of land ownership. By the end of the Ancien Régime, the clergy, municipal councils and the royal army mattered more than the lesser role of the entitled nobility.

Railways were developed in the second half of the 19th century. In September 1863, a passenger train arrived to Badajoz from Elvas, Portugal. It was the first train in the region and the first international service in the Iberian Peninsula. In 1866, the Badajoz–Ciudad Real line was completed, enabling the link with Madrid. The Madrid–Valencia de Alcántara line, a new connection passing through the province of Cáceres, was fully completed in 1881.

During the 1936–1939 Spanish Civil War, the Nationalist faction Columna Madrid advanced quickly across the province of Badajoz in August 1936 and left merciless repression and mass casualties behind. Badajoz was the Spanish province where the Francoist repression comparatively took the highest relative toll of victims during the war and the immediate Post-War period; there were around 12,000 executions in the province (out of the 14,000 in the whole region), compared to around 1,600 victims of the Republican repression.

In the mid 20th century, the Francoist dictatorship pursued a policy of colonization and agrarian reform in the region to foster the economy, transforming thousands of hectares of dryland crops into irrigated lands, also favouring the erection of 63 new settlements by the Instituto Nacional de Colonización (INC). The second half of the 20th century saw a massive rural flight out of the region, both to the industrialised areas of Spain (already started in 1955) as well as to richer European countries (such as Germany, France and Switzerland), both of which notably intensified after 1961, in the wake of the 1959 Stabilization Plan (and in the second case also after bilateral agreements reached with destination countries). The region henceforth was handed a demographic blow in the ensuing years, with the effective expulsion of nearly a 40% of the population, particularly young people.

A pre-autonomous government entity in Extremadura (the "Junta Regional de Extremadura") with jurisdiction over the provinces of Badajoz and Cáceres was created by means of a 1978 law. The draft of the regional Statute of Autonomy began in 1980, the first step toward Extremadura becoming one of the Spanish autonomous communities. The text passed its final hurdle as it was enshrined as Organic Law in 1982. The first election to the Assembly of Extremadura took place in May 1983.

== Geography ==
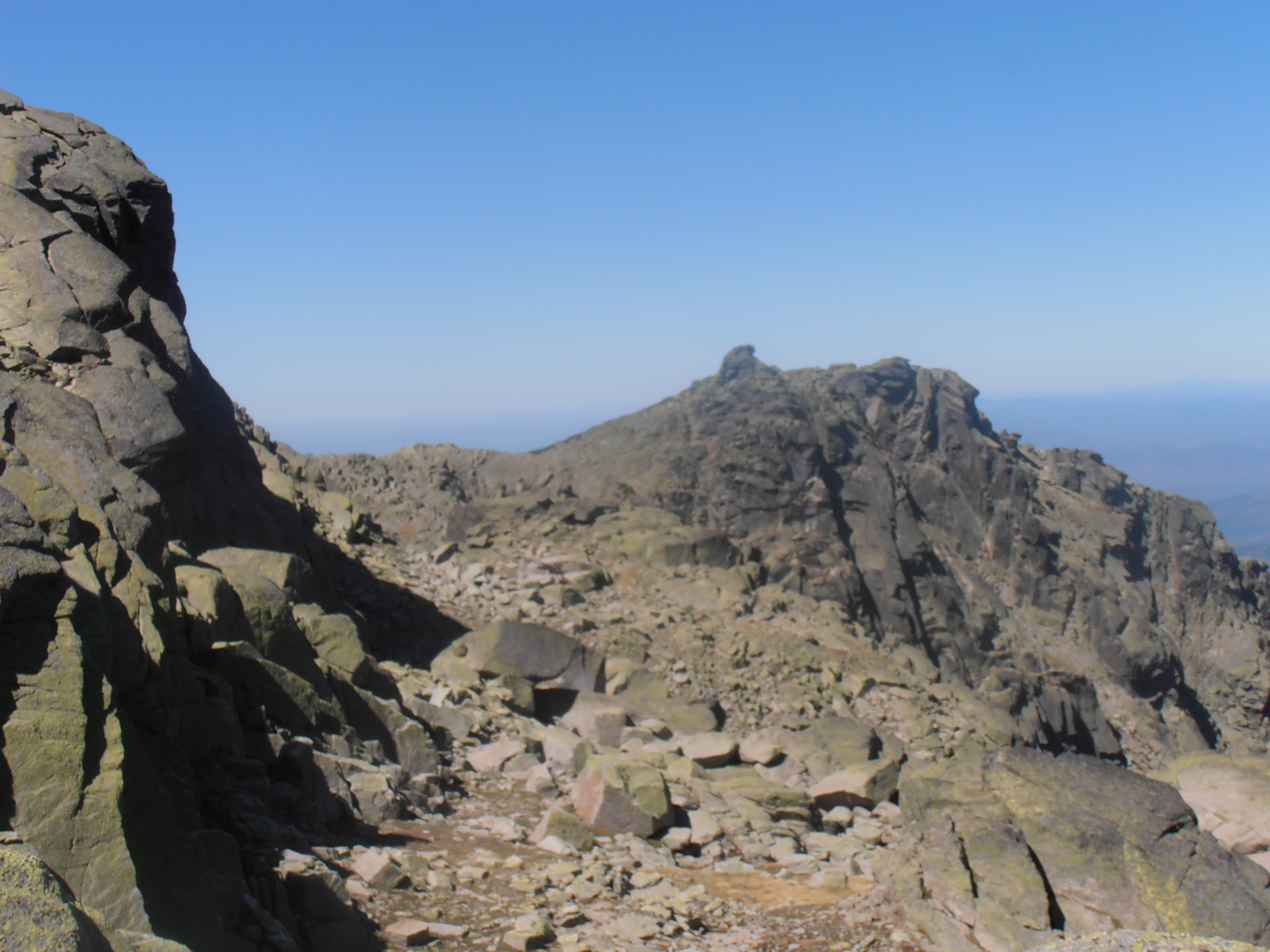
Towering over 2,400 m, the Calvitero is considered to be Extremadura's highest point.

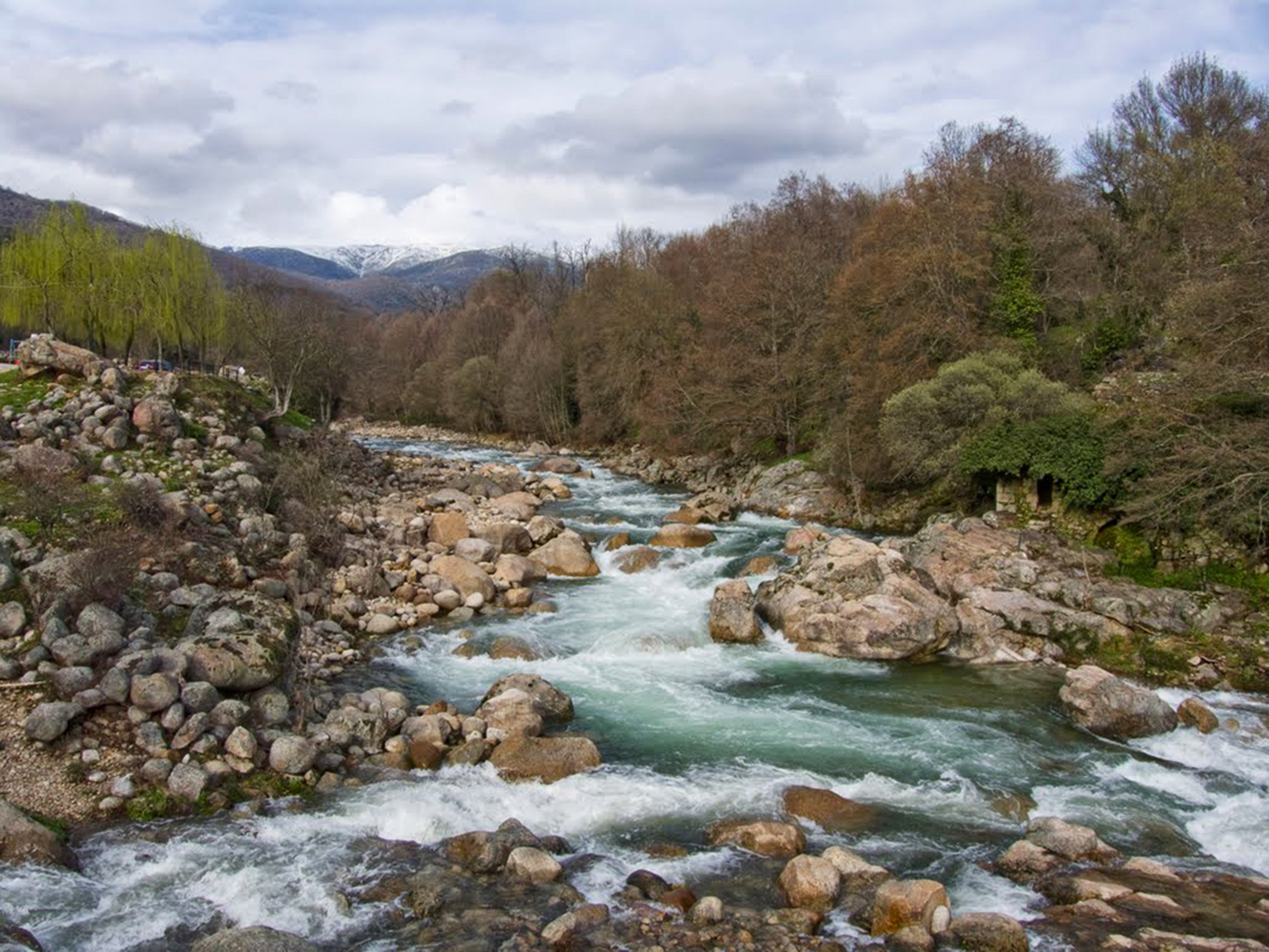
The Garganta de Cuartos in northeastern Extremadura

Extremadura is contained between 37° 57′ and 40° 29′ N latitude, and 4° 39′ and 7° 33′ W longitude.

The area of Extremadura is 41,633 km^{2} (16,075 sq mi), making it the fifth largest of the Spanish autonomous communities. It is located in the Southern Plateau (a subdivision of the Spanish Central Plateau).

The region is crossed from West to East by two large rivers, the Tagus and the Guadiana, lining up three basic areas from North to South by combining mountain ranges and rivers: the territory spanning from the Sistema Central to the Tagus, the so-called Mesopotamia extremeña in between the Tagus and the Guadiana and the territory from the Guadiana to Sierra Morena. Besides the catchment basins of the Tagus and the Guadiana covering most of the territory by far, fringe areas of the region are drained by the Douro (north) and the Guadalquivir (south). Notable Tagus tributaries include the Tiétar and the Alagón (rightbank) and the Almonte, Ibor, Salor and the Sever (leftbank). Regarding the Guadiana, important leftbank tributaries include Guadarranque and Ruecas and rightbank tributaries include the Zújar River and the Matachel.

The highest point in Extremadura, the 2,401 m (7,877 ft) high Calvitero (or El Torreón), is located in the Sistema Central, in the northeastern end of the region, bordering with Castile and León. The main subranges of the Sistema Central in Extremadura are the Sierra de Gata and Sierra de Béjar.

The modest heights of Sierra de las Villuercas (topping at 1,603 m (5,259 ft) on the Pico de las Villuercas) rise in the Mesopotamia extremeña. Other notable ranges include the Sierra de Montánchez and the Sierra de San Pedro, part of the larger Montes de Toledo system.

The Sierra Morena—the limit between Extremadura and Andalusia—and the Sierra de Tentudía (topping at 1,104 m (3,622 ft) on the Pico Tentudía) rise in the south.

There are four different hydrographic basins:

- The basin of the Tagus (Spanish: Tajo), with two principal tributaries: on the right, the Tiétar and the Alagón; and on the left, the Almonte, Ibor, Salor and the Sever. The tributaries on the right edge carry a large quantity of water, which feed the gorges of the Sistema Central where the rainfall is abundant and the winter brings a great quantity of snow.
- The basin of the Guadiana, which has principal tributaries:
- The basin of the Guadalquivir with only 1,411 km^{2} (545 sq mi) in Extremadura (2.45% of total).
- The basin of the Douro (Spanish: Duero) with only 35 km^{2} (14 sq mi) in Extremadura (0.04% of its basin).

=== Climate ===
The climate of Extremadura is predominantly hot-summer Mediterranean (Csa in the Köppen climate classification), with some regions being cold semi-arid (BSk in the Köppen climate classification). Extremadura generally presents average annual temperatures somewhat warmer than most of the hinterland of the Iberian Peninsula, featuring nonetheless a north–south gradient. Annual thermal amplitude generally ranges from 16 to 19 °C. Average annual temperature is around 16.4 °C (61.5 °F), while the average annual precipitation stands at around 588 mm. Parts of the Sistema Central presents more than 1,500 mm while it barely rains 400 mm in parts of the province of Badajoz. Summers are very hot and dry, with the rain concentrated in the cold months instead, leading to a high degree of water stress during the summer months.

Climate data for Extremadura (1991-2020), extremes (1954-present)
Month	Jan	Feb	Mar	Apr	May	Jun	Jul	Aug	Sep	Oct	Nov	Dec	Year
Record high °C (°F)	24.6 (76.3)	29.0 (84.2)	32.4 (90.3)	37.3 (99.1)	40.7 (105.3)	44.9 (112.8)	45.5 (113.9)	46.4 (115.5)	44.7 (112.5)	38.0 (100.4)	29.2 (84.6)	26.0 (78.8)	46.4 (115.5)
Mean daily maximum °C (°F)	12.3 (54.1)	14.4 (57.9)	17.9 (64.2)	20.3 (68.5)	24.8 (76.6)	30.6 (87.1)	34.4 (93.9)	34.1 (93.4)	29.0 (84.2)	22.6 (72.7)	16.2 (61.2)	12.9 (55.2)	22.5 (72.4)
Daily mean °C (°F)	7.9 (46.2)	9.2 (48.6)	12.2 (54.0)	14.3 (57.7)	18.2 (64.8)	23.1 (73.6)	26.2 (79.2)	26.1 (79.0)	22.2 (72.0)	17.1 (62.8)	11.6 (52.9)	8.7 (47.7)	16.4 (61.5)
Mean daily minimum °C (°F)	3.4 (38.1)	4.1 (39.4)	6.4 (43.5)	8.3 (46.9)	11.6 (52.9)	15.5 (59.9)	17.9 (64.2)	18.1 (64.6)	15.3 (59.5)	11.6 (52.9)	7.1 (44.8)	4.4 (39.9)	10.3 (50.5)
Record low °C (°F)	−11.0 (12.2)	−9.7 (14.5)	−9.4 (15.1)	−3.5 (25.7)	−1.0 (30.2)	3.4 (38.1)	6.0 (42.8)	4.9 (40.8)	3.4 (38.1)	−2.2 (28.0)	−8.2 (17.2)	−8.3 (17.1)	−11.0 (12.2)
Average precipitation mm (inches)	64.4 (2.54)	53.1 (2.09)	57.4 (2.26)	57.4 (2.26)	49.2 (1.94)	15.4 (0.61)	4.1 (0.16)	6.5 (0.26)	34.5 (1.36)	88.9 (3.50)	79.1 (3.11)	78.2 (3.08)	588.2 (23.17)
Source: Agencia Estatal de Meteorologia

== Government and administration ==
=== Autonomous ===
The Statute of Autonomy of Extremadura (enacted in 1983) is the fundamental organic law regulating the autonomous government, and it establishes the institutions through which the autonomous community exerts its powers:

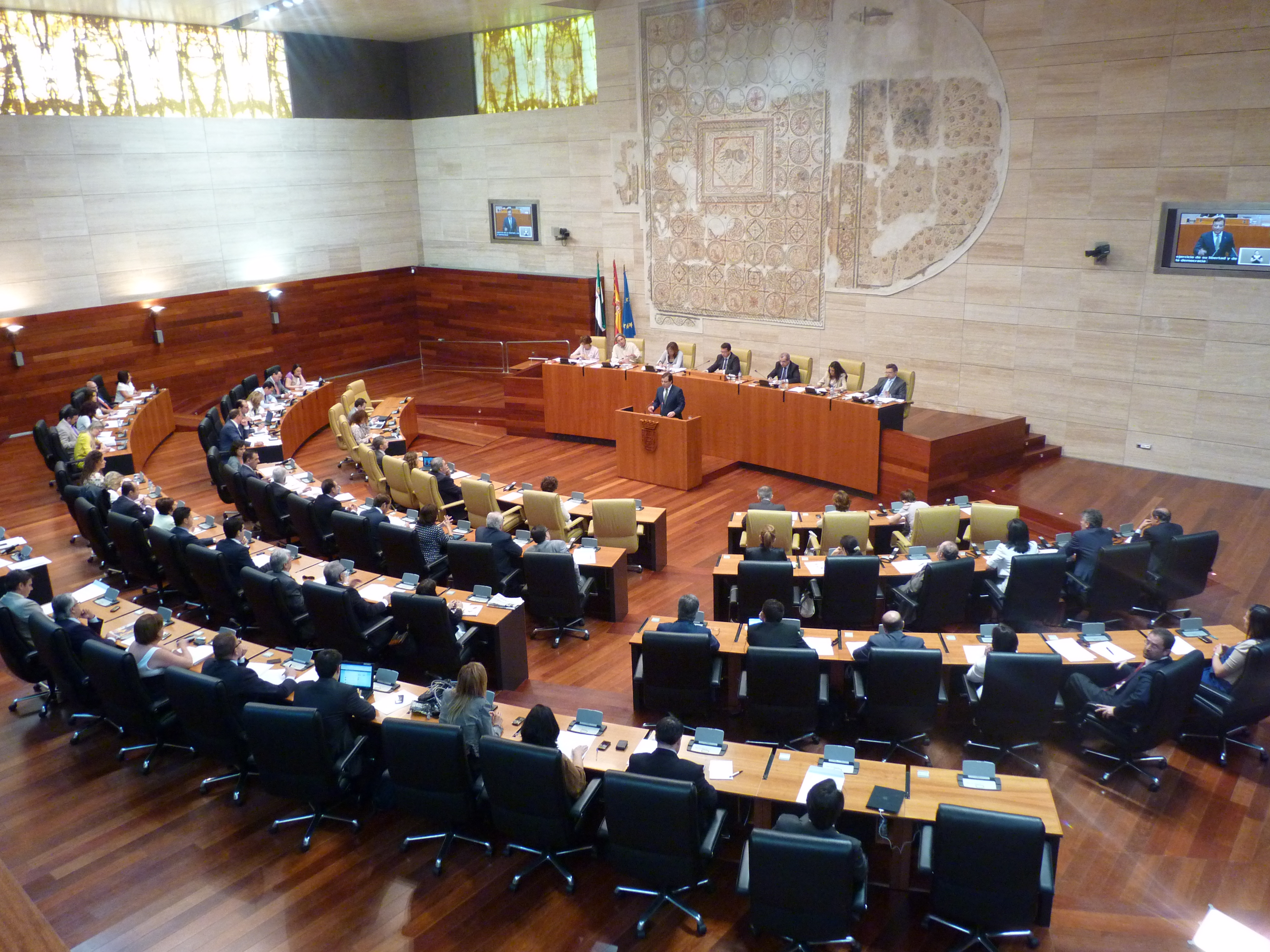
The hemicycle of the Assembly of Extremadura

- Assembly of Extremadura. The following are some of the functions conferred to the legislature: exerting legislative power in the autonomous community, the promotion and control of the Junta of Extremadura, the passing of the regional budget, the designation of senators correspondent to the autonomous community or the control of the media dependent on the regional government. Its members (currently 65) are directly elected through the means of proportional representation and close party lists with an electoral threshold of 5% (the most benign between the total voting percentage and the voting percentage in a particular electoral district) in two electoral districts: Badajoz and Cáceres, corresponding to the two provinces of the region.
- Junta of Extremadura. It is the collegiate body comprised by the regional president, the vice-president and the ministers (consejeros) exerting the executive and administrative functions of the regional government.
- President of the Junta of Extremadura. The officeholder is charged with directing and coordinating the action of the Junta of Extremadura, being the highest representative of Extremadura while also holding the ordinary representation of the State in the region. The regional president is elected by the legislature from among its members, needing to command an absolute majority of votes in the first round of investiture or a simple majority of positive votes in successive rounds. The president personally selects the ministers of the Junta.

=== Provincial ===
The government body for each of the provinces is the deputation (diputación): the Provincial Deputation of Badajoz and the Provincial Deputation of Cáceres. The members of the plenary of the deputation are indirectly elected from among the municipal councillors based on the results of the municipal elections. In turn, the plenary elects the president of the deputation from among its members.

=== Administrative divisions ===
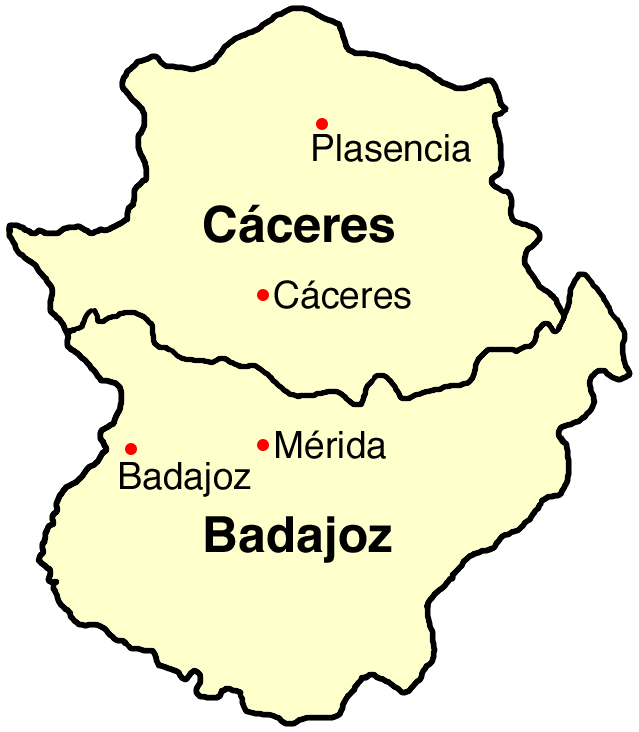
Map of the provinces of Extremadura and their two largest cities

Extremadura is divided into 2 provinces, which are in turn divided into 388 municipalities.

Province	Capital	Population (2025)	Area (km²)	Density (inh./km²)	Municipalities
Badajoz	Badajoz	665,155	21,769.11	30.6	165
Cáceres	Cáceres	388,190	19,864.50	19.5	223

There are also traditional comarcas in Extremadura, like Las Villuercas and Las Hurdes, but these do not have much official recognition.

== Demographics ==
Historical population
Year	Pop.	±%
1842	626,052	—
1857	707,115	+12.9%
1877	725,984	+2.7%
1887	808,685	+11.4%
1900	874,392	+8.1%
1910	989,650	+13.2%
1920	1,064,318	+7.5%
1930	1,152,170	+8.3%
1940	1,251,840	+8.7%
1950	1,365,959	+9.1%
1960	1,406,329	+3.0%
1970	1,169,396	−16.8%
1981	1,064,968	−8.9%
1991	1,061,852	−0.3%
2001	1,058,503	−0.3%
2011	1,104,500	+4.3%
2021	1,061,636	−3.9%
Source: INE

As of 2025, the population is 1,053,345, of which 49.4% are males, and 50.6% are females. Minors make up 15.4% of the population, and seniors make up 22.9%.

The Extremaduran population, according to the 1591 census of the provinces of the Kingdom of Castile, was around 540,000 people, making up 8% of the total population of Spain. No other census was performed until 1717, when 326,358 people were counted as living in Extremadura. The population in 1833 was 547,420.

From this period, the population grew steadily until the 1960s (1,406,329 people in 1960). After 1960, emigration to more prosperous regions of Spain and Europe drained the population.

The urban network is dominated by three municipalities between 50,000 and 200,000 inhabitants (Badajoz, Cáceres and Mérida), followed by Plasencia, the Don Benito-Villanueva de la Serena conurbation and Almendralejo. Other municipalities with a population above 10,000 inhabitants include Zafra, Montijo, Villafranca de los Barros, Navalmoral de la Mata and Coria.

=== Languages ===
The only official language is Spanish (whose local dialects are collectively called Castúo), but other languages and dialects are also spoken. The Fala, a Galician-Portuguese language, is a specially protected language and is spoken in the valley of Jálama. The Extremaduran language, the collective name for a group of vernacular dialects related to Leonese is endangered. Local variants of Portuguese are native to Cedillo and Herrera de Alcántara. Portuguese has also been accounted to be spoken as well by some people (mainly those born before the 1940s) in Olivenza.

Reported phonological distinctive features of the Spanish dialectal variants spoken in the region include instances of seseo (in some areas of the province of Badajoz), loss of intervocalic /d/, j and word-initial h aspiration, r → l substitution, and yeísmo.

=== Major cities and towns ===
Largest municipalities in Extremadura INE – 2025
Rank		Province	Pop.	Rank		Province	Pop.
1	Badajoz	Badajoz	150,870	11	Villafranca de los Barros	Badajoz	12,285
2	Cáceres	Cáceres	96,598	12	Coria	Cáceres	12,004
3	Mérida	Badajoz	60,319	13	Olivenza	Badajoz	11,775
4	Plasencia	Cáceres	40,224	14	Miajadas	Cáceres	9,393
5	Don Benito	Badajoz	38,009	15	Jerez de los Caballeros	Badajoz	9,104
6	Almendralejo	Badajoz	34,544	16	Trujillo	Cáceres	8,660
7	Villanueva de la Serena	Badajoz	25,751	17	Los Santos de Maimona	Badajoz	8,101
8	Navalmoral de la Mata	Cáceres	17,297	18	Azuaga	Badajoz	7,594
9	Zafra	Badajoz	16,708	19	Talayuela	Cáceres	7,425
10	Montijo	Badajoz	15,195	20	Jaraíz de la Vera	Cáceres	6,835

=== Immigration ===
Foreign population by country of birth (2025)
Country of birth	Population
Morocco	10,840
Colombia	6,406
Romania	6,296
Portugal	4,134
Venezuela	3,053
Peru	2,592
Brazil	2,572
Honduras	2,209
Nicaragua	2,193
Argentina	1,858
France	1,837
Germany	1,721
Cuba	1,616
China	1,599
Ecuador	1,369

As of 2025, immigrants make up 6.0% of the population, the lowest proportion among Spain's autonomous communities. The 5 largest foreign countries of birth are Morocco, Colombia, Romania, Portugal, and Venezuela.

== Economy ==
The gross domestic product (GDP) of Extremadura was 20 billion euros in 2018, accounting for 1.7% of Spanish economic output. GDP per capita adjusted for purchasing power was 20,100 euros or 67% of the EU27 average in the same year. Extremadura was the community with the second lowest GDP per capita in Spain before Melilla.

Export goods (mostly consisting of food and semimanufactures) are primarily sent to the European market, but there has been a growing share of non-EU export destinations throughout the 2010s. Balance of trade is generally positive.

The unemployment rate stood at 17.3% in 2022, significantly lower than in the previous decade.

=== Agriculture ===
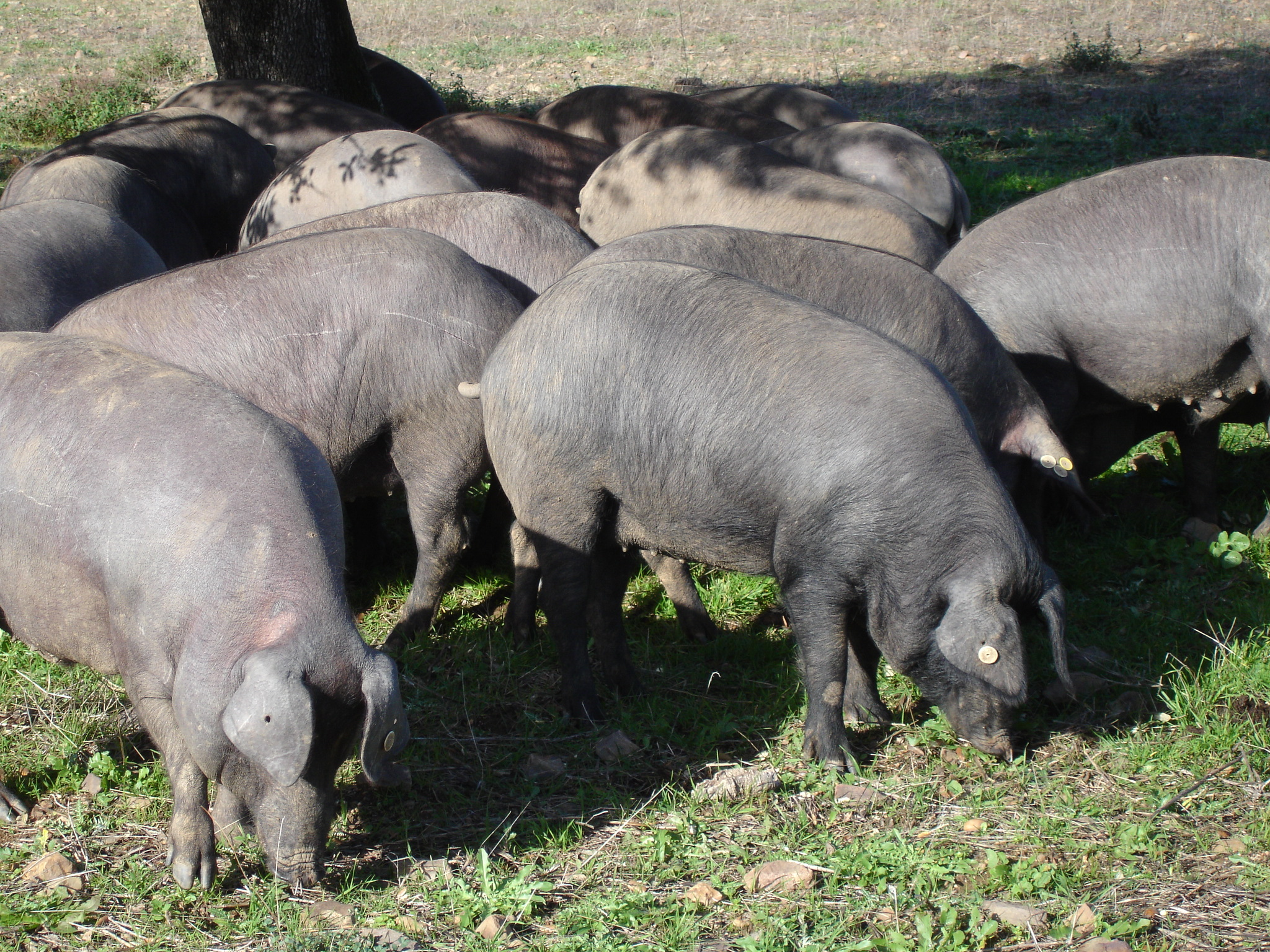
Iberian pigs in Extremadura

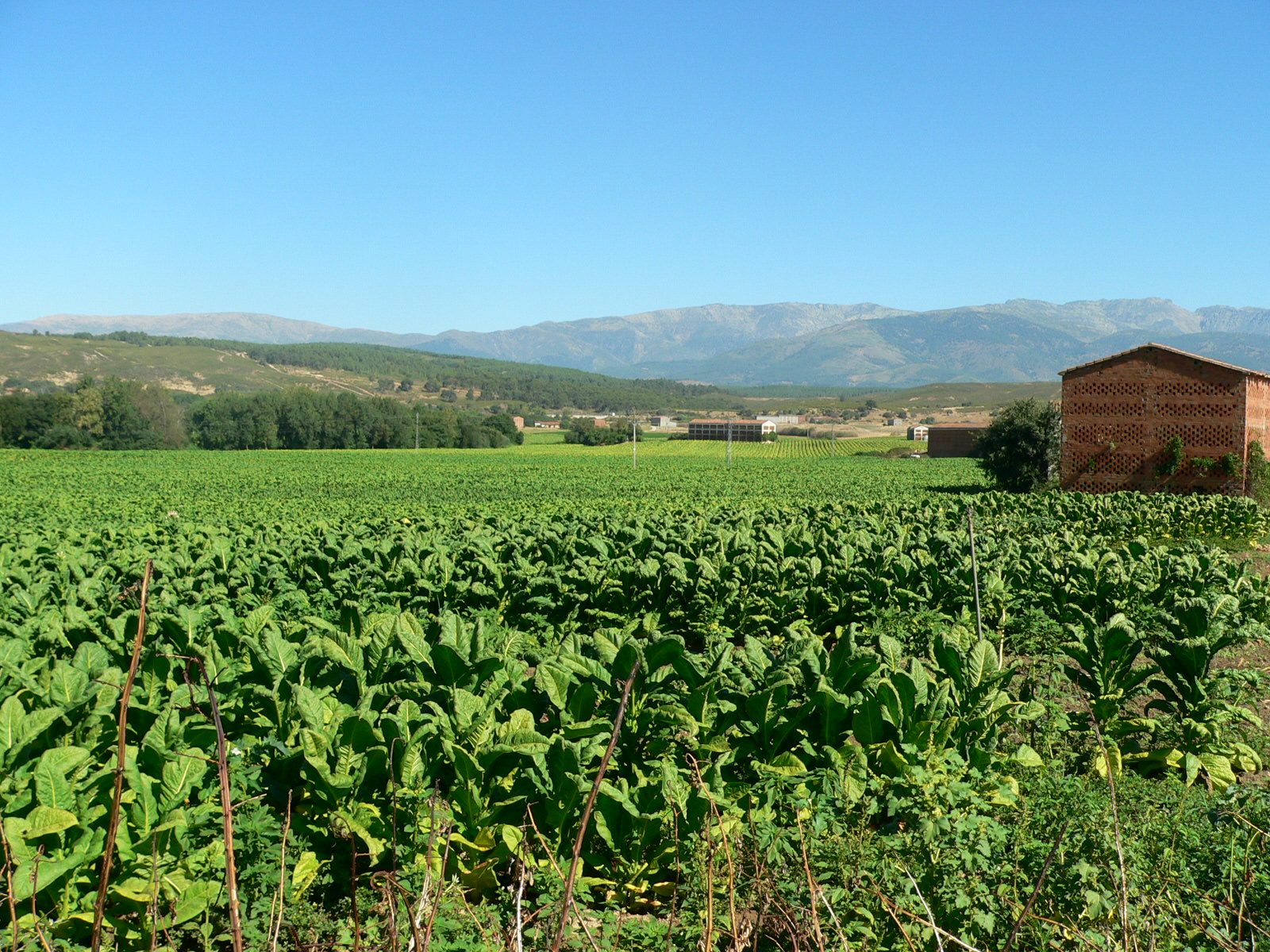
Tobacco field in La Vera

Wild black Iberian pigs roam in the area and consume acorns from oak groves. These pigs are caught and used for the cured ham dish jamón ibérico. The higher the percentage of acorns eaten by the pigs, the more valuable the ham. For example, jamón ibérico from pigs whose diet consists of 90% acorns or more can be sold for more than twice as much as ham whose pigs ate on average less than 70% acorns. In the US, jamón ibérico directly from Extremadura, with bone, was illegal until around 2005. At that time, enough US restaurants were in demand for the delicacy that Spain decided to export it as boneless, which the US Department of Agriculture's health codes would approve (and continue to do).

85 Extremaduran municipalities constitute the jurisdiction of the "Dehesa de Extremadura" Protected Designation of Origin (PDO), which protects jamones and paletas (hind and front pig legs) originated from Iberian pigs and mixed Iberian/Duroc-Jersey pigs.

As of 2021, Extremadura produces about 98% of the tobacco produced in Spain, also being the leading European producing region. Tobacco production concentrates in La Vera and Campo Arañuelo.

Tomato production (2,122,000 tonnes in 2017) primarily concentrates in the riverbanks of the Guadiana and the Alagón-Árrago.

A large part of the region falls within the scope of the Ribera del Guadiana PDO, which is further divided in the Ribera Alta, Tierra de Barros, Matanegra, Ribera Baja, Montánchez, and Cañamero wine subregions. The PDO protects the wines made of several varieties of black and white grapes.

As of 2021, Extremadura is the second largest rice producing region in Spain, after Andalusia. Due to drought and high water demands from rice fields, non-irrigated rice fields have been favoured since the late 2010s. Together with Murcia, Extremadura is a major producer of paprika, primarily destined to the Spanish market. Peppers are grown in the "Pimentón de la Vera" PDO, consisting of the comarcas of La Vera, Campo Arañuelo, Valle del Ambroz and Valle del Alagón. The PDO produced 3,860 tonnes in 2020.

=== Energy ===
About half the value of the regional industrial production belongs to the energy sector. Extremadura presents a huge energy surplus, producing about four times the energy it consumes. This situation has led to the characterization of Extremadura as a potential "colony" of the private electricity companies, which are not taxed in the region and employ a relatively low share of the industrial workforce. The Tagus is dammed in the reservoirs of Alcántara, Torrejón and Valdecañas whereas the Guadiana is dammed in the reservoirs of Cíjara, Puerto Peña, Orellana and Zújar. Due to the orographic conditions, the Tagus is better suited for hydroelectric use than the Guadiana. As of 2021, the region has around 2,193.84 MW of installed hydroelectric power, primarily controlled by Endesa and Iberdrola, with a lesser role of Grupo Pitarch.

The two reactors of the Almaraz Nuclear Power Plant (which were put in operation in 1981 and 1983, respectively) are jointly operated by Endesa, Iberdrola and Naturgy. They generate a power of 1,048.43 MW and 1,044.45 MW.

The region is at the forefront of Spain's plans for energy transition and a decarbonisation, thanks to the installation of large solar power plants and the granting of lithium mining licenses. Such prospects sparked criticism and concern regarding how to avoid a "third energy colonisation" after those of the construction of reservoirs for hydroelectric use and the building of nuclear power plants. Two of the largest photovoltaic power plants in Europe are located in the region: Francisco Pizarro (590 MW) in Torrecillas de la Tiesa and Núñez de Balboa (500 MW) in Usagre; both are operated by Iberdrola, which is developing another 6 photovoltaic plants collectively amounting to 1,300 MW. The first solar thermal power plant in the region, Alvarado I, (50 MW) opened in 2009.

A project to build a lithium-ion battery factory participated by Envision in Navalmoral de la Mata was announced in June 2022.

== Transport ==
=== Air ===
Badajoz Airport is the only airport in the Extremadura region which provides direct routes to Madrid, Barcelona, Gran Canaria and Palma de Mallorca which are operated by Iberia. Generally, residents in the region would also use other nearby airports such as Madrid–Barajas Airport, Seville Airport, and Humberto Delgado Airport in the nearby border of Portugal.

== Sport ==
- In football:
  - CD Extremadura
  - Extremadura Femenino CF, also known as CF Puebla Extremadura, the women's team
  - AD Mérida
  - CD Badajoz
  - CD Don Benito
  - CP Cacereño
  - UP Plasencia

== See also ==
- Extremaduran cuisine
- Extremadura (Vino de la Tierra)
- List of presidents of the Extremaduran Assembly
- New Extremadura
