= Pulo do Lobo =

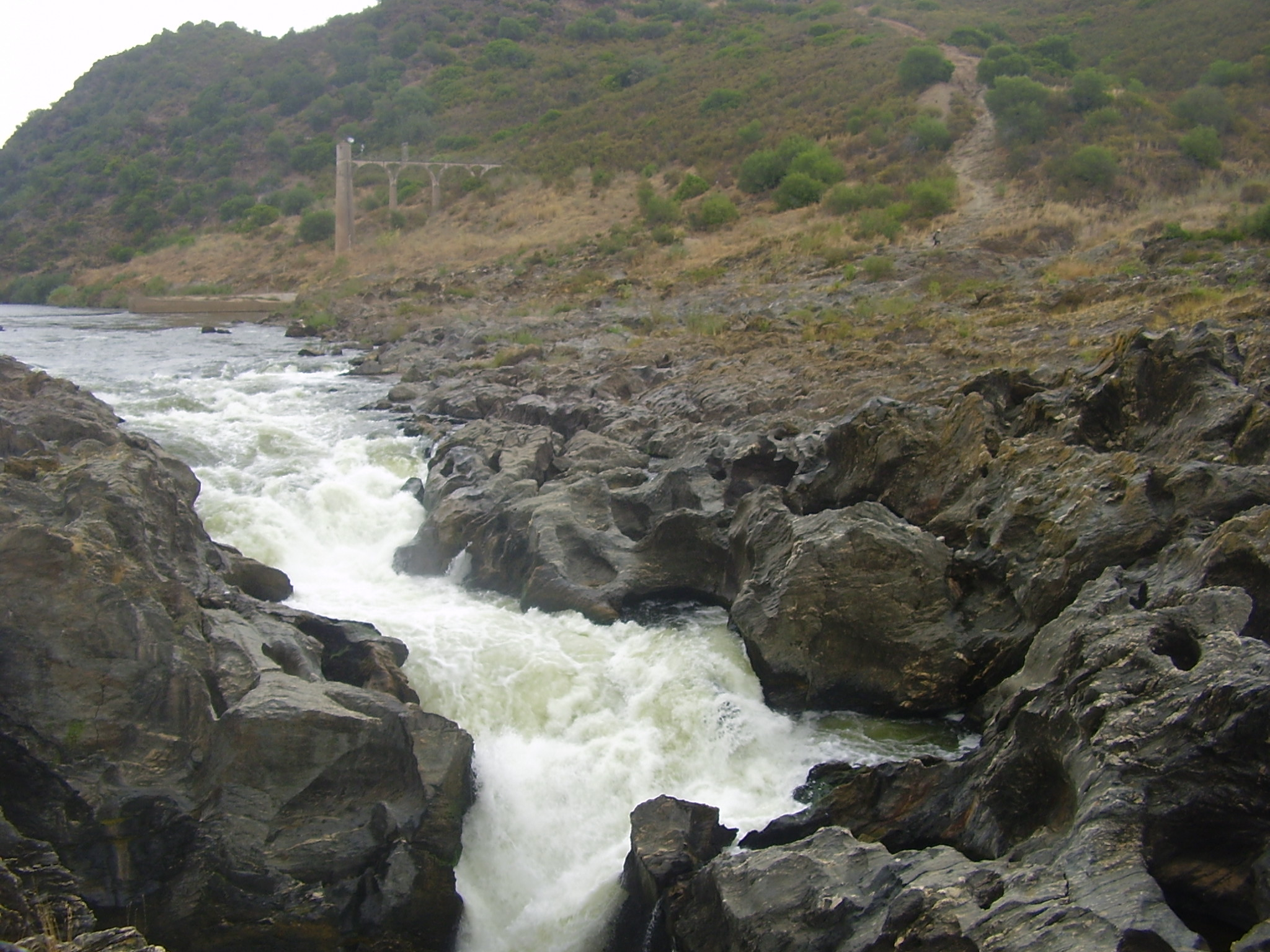
- Pulo do Lobo
- Interactive map of Pulo do Lobo
- Location: Guadiana Valley Natural Park, Portugal
- Coordinates: 37°48′14.83″N 7°38′0.82″W
- Total height: 20 m (66 ft)
- Watercourse: Guadiana River

Pulo do Lobo is a waterfall 17 km north of Mértola, in the Lower Alentejo region of Portugal. It is the highest waterfall in Southern Portugal. Its name means "wolf's leap" in Portuguese; it was said that only a brave man or a wild animal when chased could leap over the gorge that was created by the waterfall. This waterfall is located at an altitude of between 33 and 35 metres in a very narrow gorge in the River Guadiana.

Pulo do Lobo is the most dramatic stretch of the Guadiana, where the "river boils between harsh walls, the rushing of water, hit, flow and wind gnawing a millimeter per century per millennium, a nothing in eternity" as José Saramago, one of Portugal's most famous writers, wrote.

The Pulo do Lobo is formed by the Guadiana river which separates Spain and Portugal. The waterfall is a very majestic sight and is full of native wildlife.

== See also ==
- List of waterfalls
