= Torrecillas de la Tiesa =

- municipality
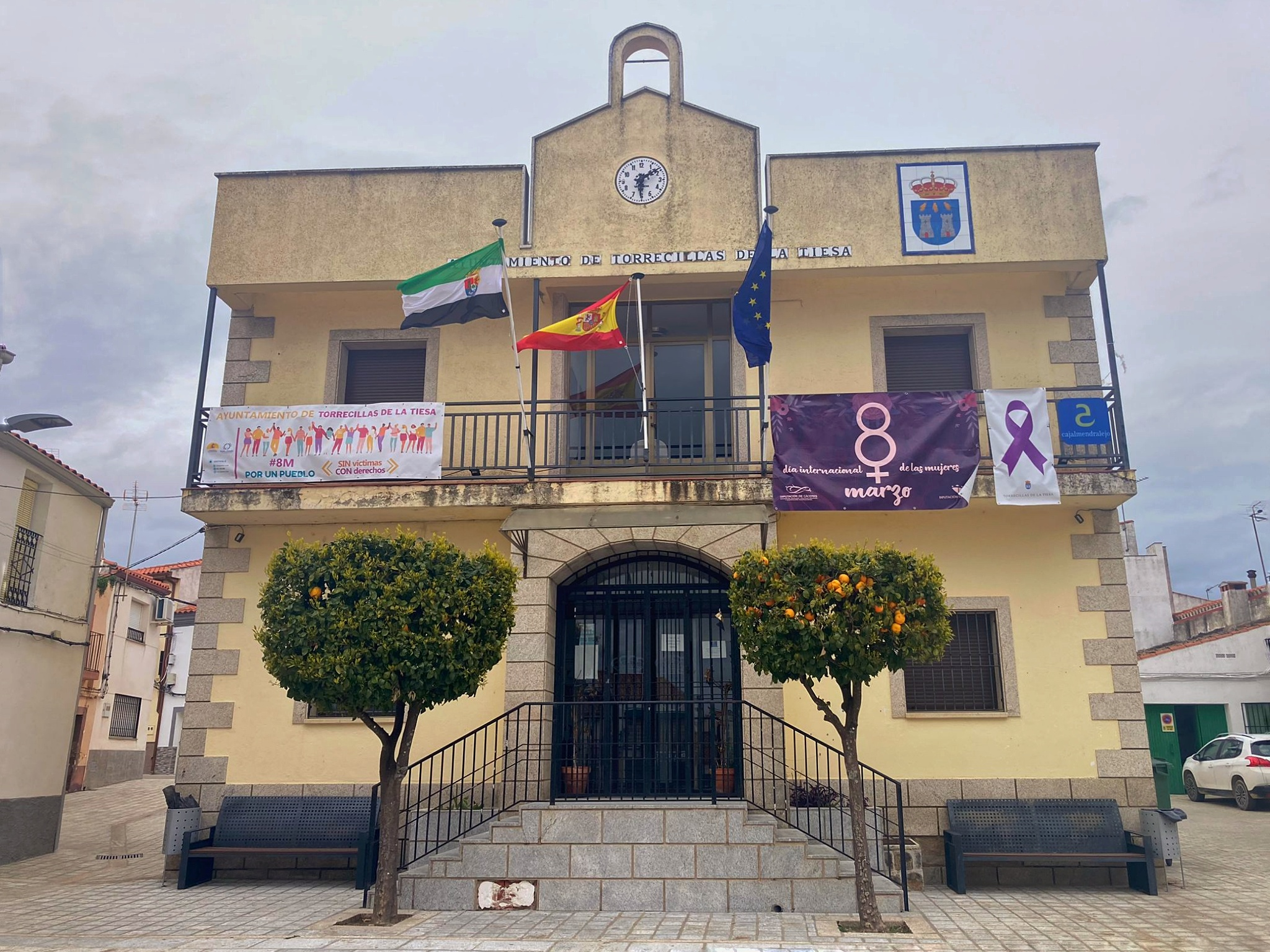
- Town hall

- Coat of arms

- Location in Spain.
- Coordinates: 39°34′N 5°44′W
- Country: Spain
- Autonomous community: Extremadura
- Province: Cáceres
- Comarca: Tierra de Trujillo

Government
  - Mayor: Tomás Sánchez Campos

Area
  - Total: 140 km^{2} (54 sq mi)
- Elevation: 510 m (1,670 ft)

Population (2025-01-01)
  - Total: 1,038
  - Density: 7.4/km^{2} (19/sq mi)
- Time zone: UTC+1 (CET)
  - Summer (DST): UTC+2 (CEST)
- Website: Official website

Torrecillas de la Tiesa is a municipality located in the province of Cáceres, Extremadura, western Spain.

== See also ==
- List of municipalities in Cáceres
