= Almonte (river) =

River in Spain

Coordinates: 39.6842°N 6.45996°W

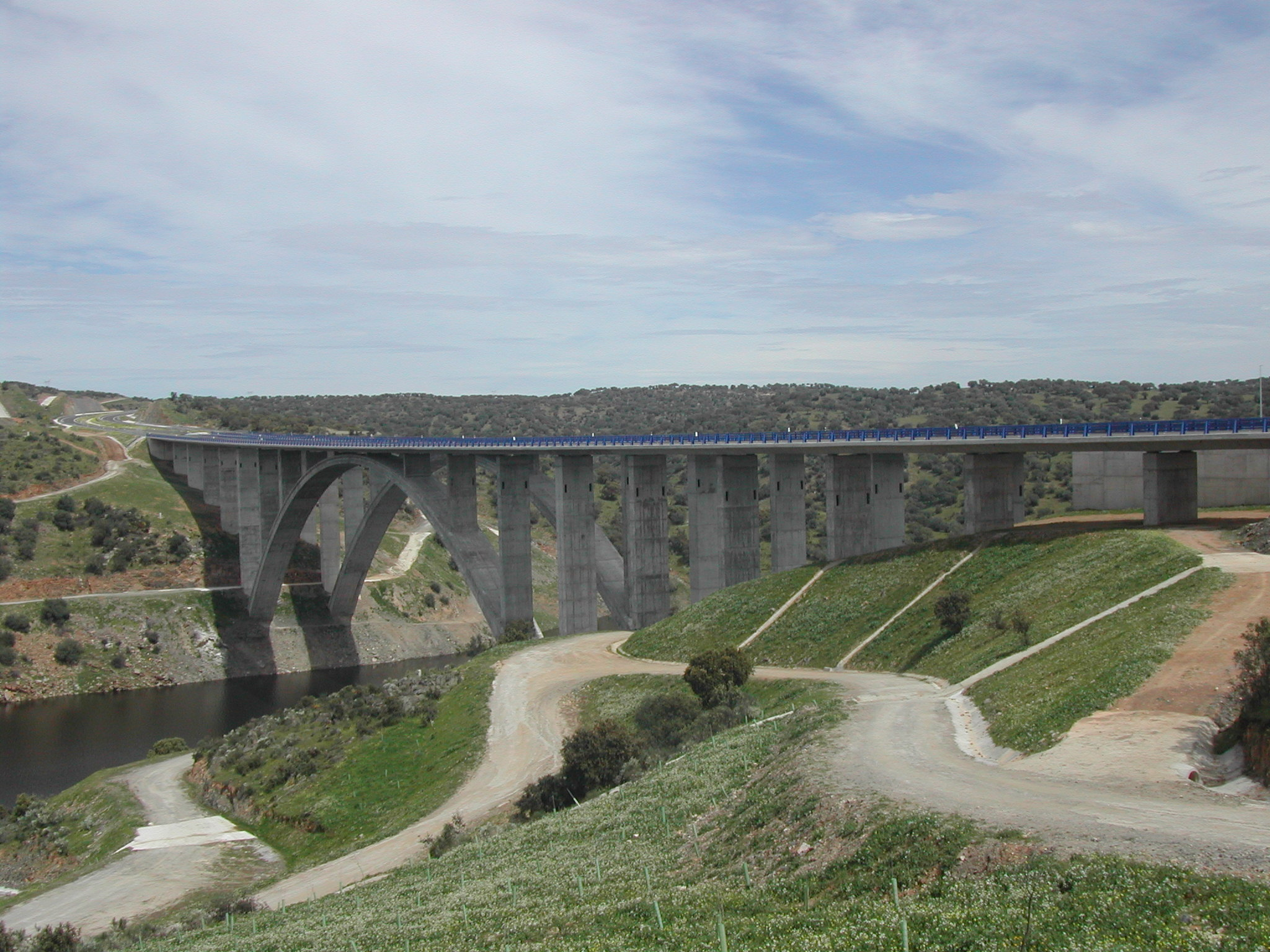
- A-66 bridge across the river Almonte

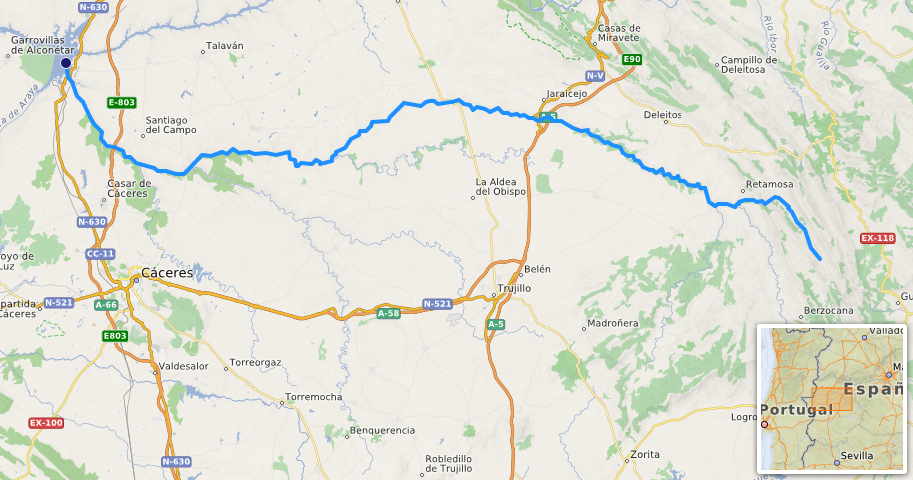
- Course of the Almonte

Location
- Country: Spain
- Region: Extremadura
- District: Province of Cáceres

Physical characteristics
- Source
  - location: Sierra de Villuercas
- Length: 97 km (60 mi)
- Discharge
  - location: Tagus

Basin features
- Progression: Tagus→ Atlantic Ocean

The Almonte is a river in Spain. The 97 km (60 mi) long river is a left tributary of the Tajo, the longest river of the Iberian peninsula. It lies in its entirety in the Extremadura region.
