= Cíjara Dam =

Spanish reservoir on the Guadiana River

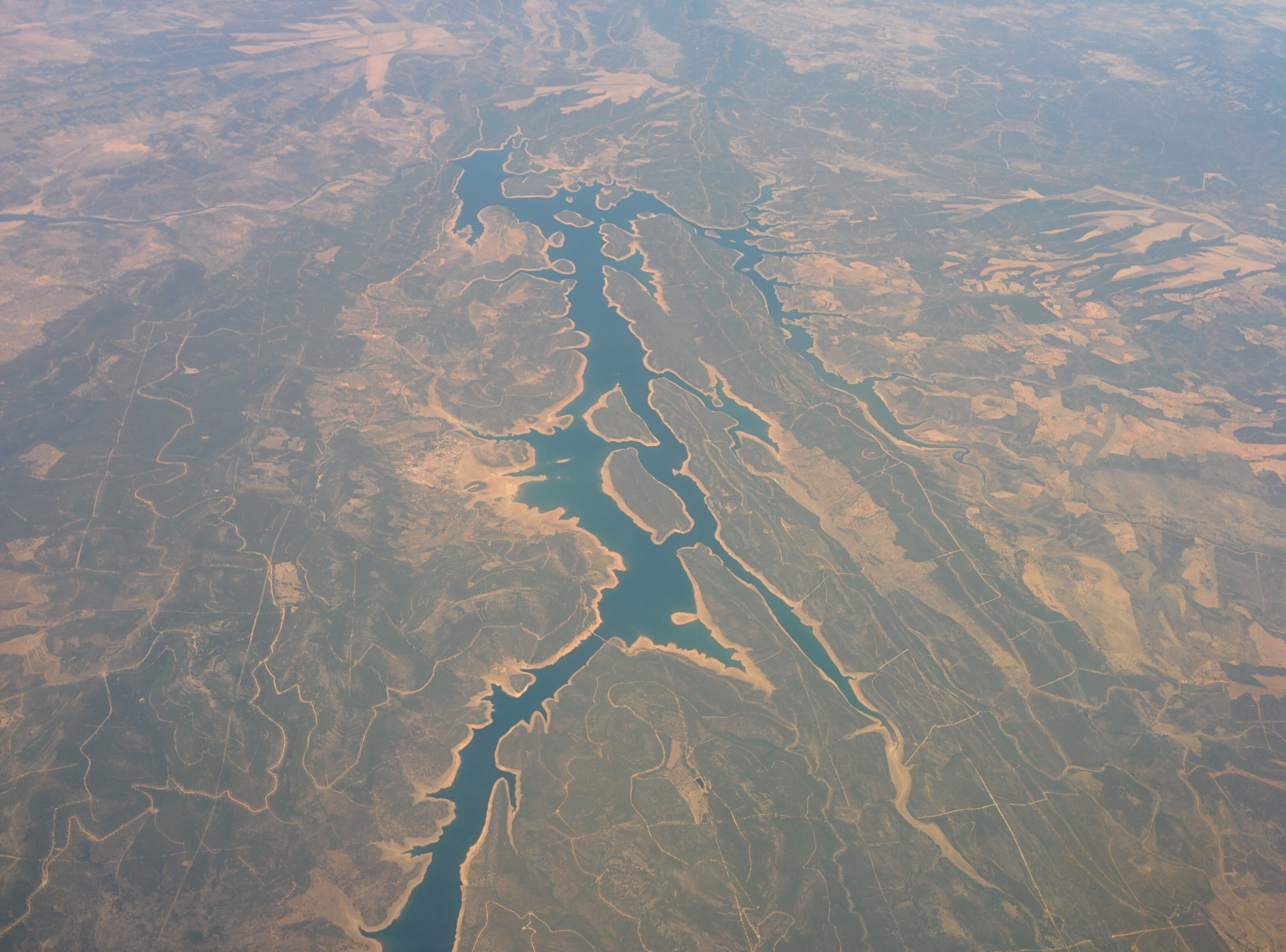
- Aerial view of the Cíjara reservoir, between Cáceres and Badajoz
- Interactive map of Cíjara Dam
- Country: Spain
- Location: Extremadura
- Coordinates: 39.3°N 4.86667°W
- Purpose: Multi-purpose
- Status: Operational
- Opening date: 1956
- Designed by: J. Tirado Cruz; R. Catena
- Owner: Spanish state

Dam and spillways
- Type of dam: Gravity dam
- Impounds: Guadiana River
- Height (foundation): 80.5 metres (264 ft)
- Length: 295 metres (968 ft)
- Spillways: 1
- Spillway type: Open channel
- S pillway volumetric flow rate: 1,040 cubic metres per second (37,000 cu ft/s)

Reservoir
- Creates: Cíjara Reservoir
- Total capacity: 1,505 cubic hectometres (5.31×10^{10} cu ft)
- Surface area: 6,565 hectares (16,220 acres)

Left & Right Bank Power Plants
- Operator: Endesa
- Type: Pumped-storage
- Turbines: 3 (left), 1 (right)
- Installed capacity: 51.7 MW (left), 50.4 MW (right)
- Annual generation: 78.372 GW·h (right)

Cíjara Dam is a reservoir on the Guadiana River, located in Extremadura, Spain. It was built in 1956.
