= Povedilla =

Coordinates: 38°42′N 2°36′W

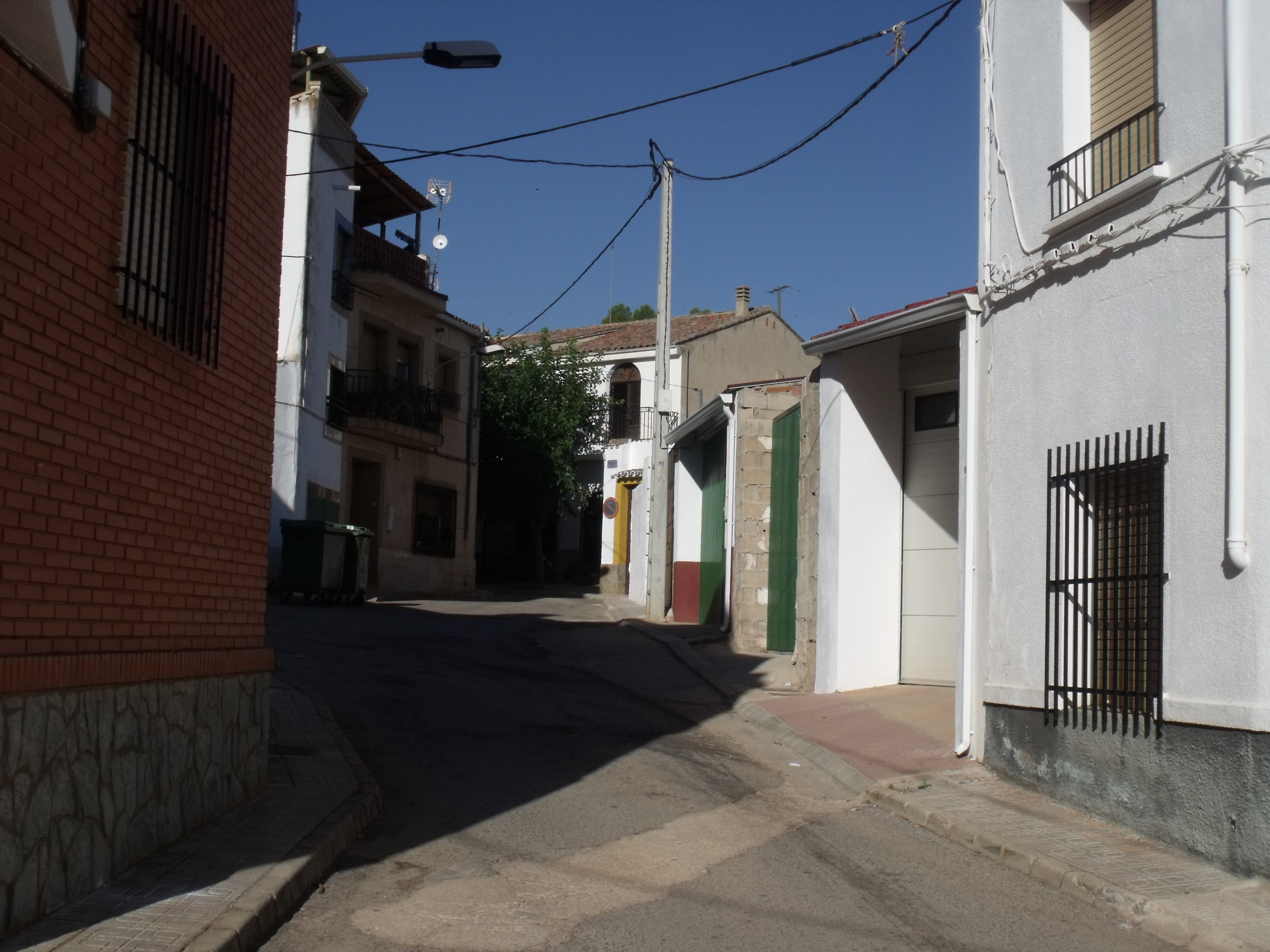

Coat of arms of Povedilla

Povedilla is a municipality in Albacete, Castile-La Mancha, Spain. It has a population of 393.
