= Guadiana =

River in the Iberian peninsula

Guadiana River
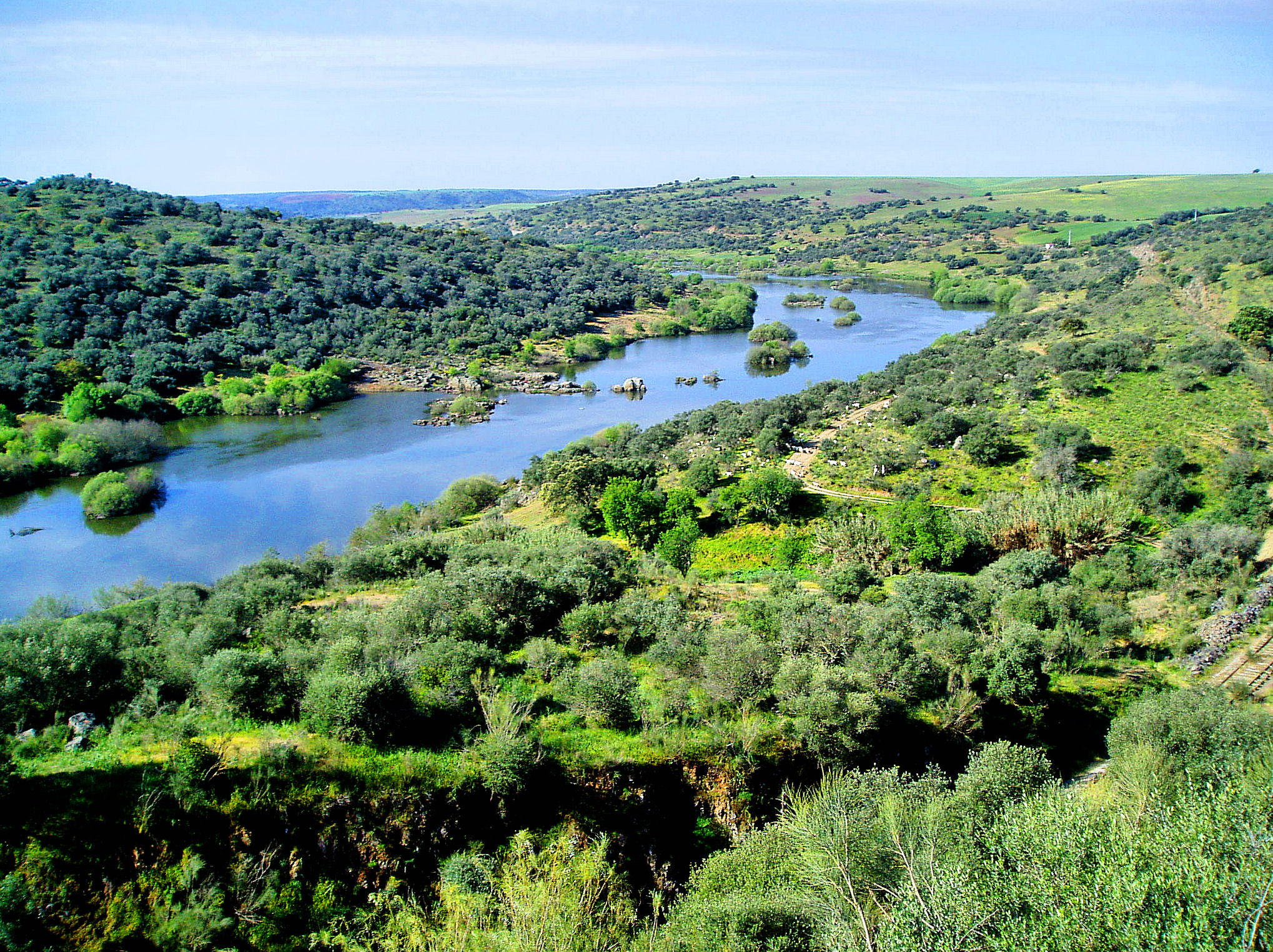
- The Guadiana River in the area around Serpa, Portugal

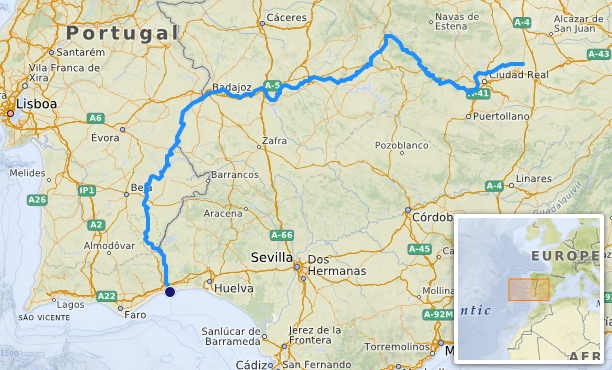
- About 83 percent, 55,000 square kilometres (21,000 mi^{2}), of the River Guadiana watershed is in Spain; the rest is in Portugal (interactive map)
- Etymology: Arabic Wādī Āna (وادي آنة), meaning 'Anas River', from Celtiberian Anas, 'bayou'
- Native name: Río Guadiana (Spanish); Rio Guadiana (Portuguese)

Location
- Countries: Spain and Portugal
- Regions: Castile–La Mancha, Extremadura, Andalusia, Alentejo and Algarve

Physical characteristics
- Source: Ojos del Guadiana
  - location: Villarrubia de los Ojos, Castile–La Mancha, Spain
  - coordinates: 39°7′36″N 3°43′36″W
  - elevation: 608 m (1,995 ft)
- Mouth: Gulf of Cádiz
  - location: Vila Real de Santo António, Algarve, Portugal
  - coordinates: 37°10′12″N 7°23′37″W
  - elevation: 0 m (0 ft)
- Length: 818 km (508 mi)
- Basin size: 67,733 km^{2} (26,152 sq mi)
- Depth
  - minimum: 5 m (16 ft)
  - maximum: 17 m (56 ft)
- Discharge
  - average: 78.8 m^{3}/s (2,780 cu ft/s)
  - minimum: 20 m^{3}/s (710 cu ft/s)
  - maximum: 1,500 m^{3}/s (53,000 cu ft/s)

Basin features
- Tributaries
  - left: Upper Guadiana; Azuer; Jabalón; Zújar; Matachel; Ardila; Chança River
  - right: Cigüela / Záncara; Bullaque; Estena; Degebe; Ribeira do Vascão

The Guadiana (/ˌɡwɑːdiˈɑːnə/ GWAH-dee-AH-nə, US also /ɡwɑːdˈjɑːnə/ gwahd-YAH-nə, Spanish: [ɡwaˈðjana], Portuguese: [ɡwɐˈðjɐnɐ]) is an international river defining a long stretch of the Portugal-Spain border, separating Extremadura and Andalusia (Spain) from Alentejo and Algarve (Portugal). The river's basin extends from la Mancha and the eastern portion of Extremadura to the southern provinces of the Algarve; the river and its tributaries flow from east to west, then south through Portugal to the border towns of Vila Real de Santo António (Portugal) and Ayamonte (Spain), where it flows into the Gulf of Cádiz. With a course that covers a distance of 829 kilometres (515 mi), it is the fourth-longest in the Iberian Peninsula, and its hydrological basin extends over an area around 68,000 square kilometres (26,000 mi^{2}) (the majority of which lies within Spain). In Portuguese, the name Guadiana has replaced Odiana, now an archaic form.

== Etymology ==
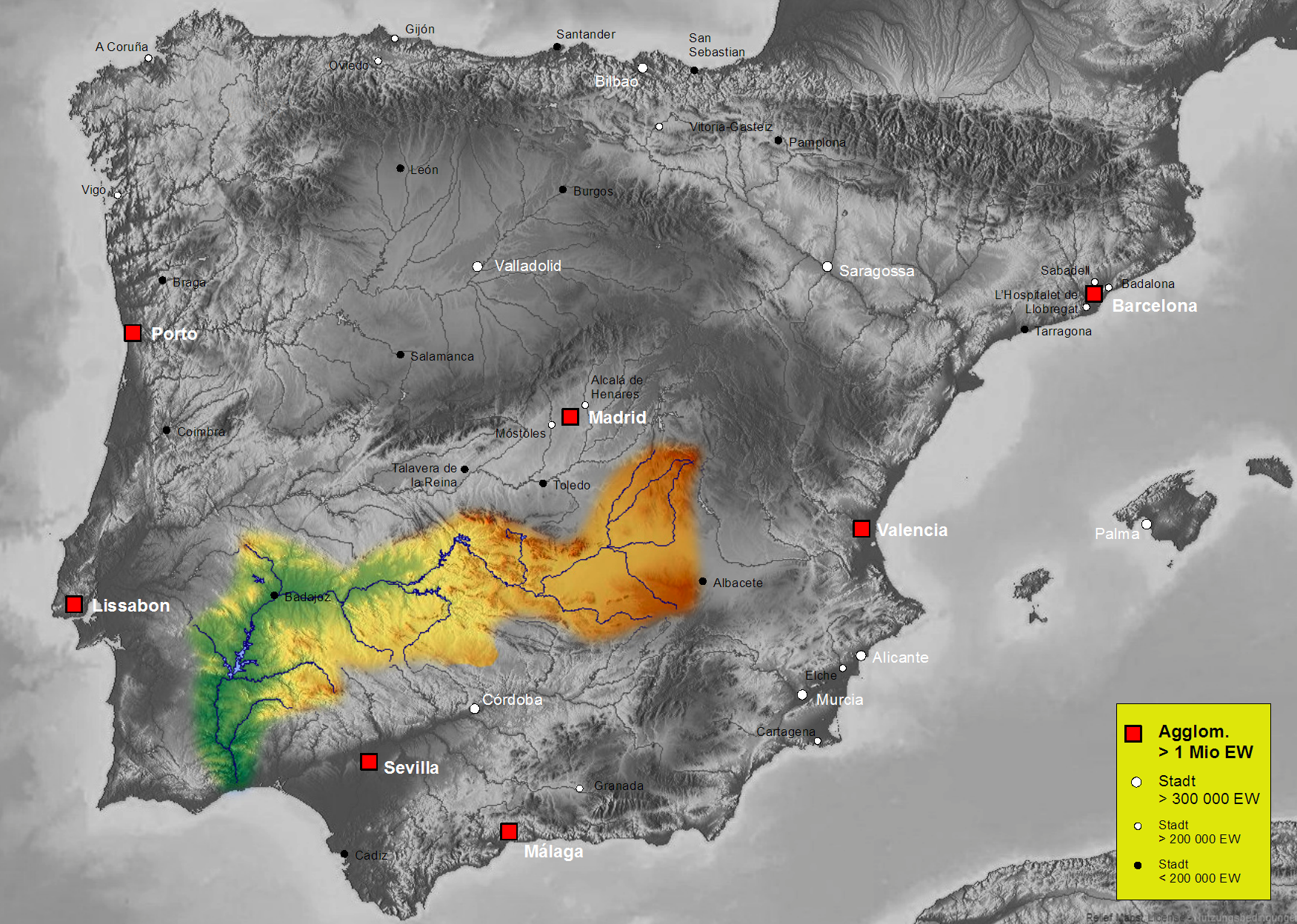
The Guadiana drainage basin in the Iberian peninsula

Ptolemy's Geography recorded the Celtiberian name as Anas, meaning a marshy area or bayou. The Romans adapted this name as Flūmen Anās, which was etymolygised as the 'River of Ducks'. After the Muslim conquest of the Iberian Peninsula, the name was extended and referred to as Wādī Āna (وادي آنة), later passed on to Portuguese and Spanish settlers as the Ouadiana, and later just Odiana. Since the 16th century, the name slowly evolved to take on the form Guadiana, a cognitive variation that developed from many Andalusi river placenames beginning in wadi using the prefix guad- such as the hydronyms Guadalquivir, Guadalete, and Guadarrama.

== Watershed ==
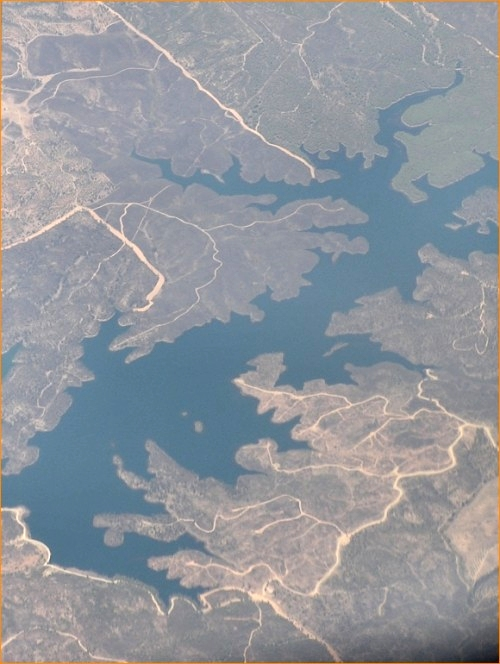
Lake Alqueva along the River Guadiana

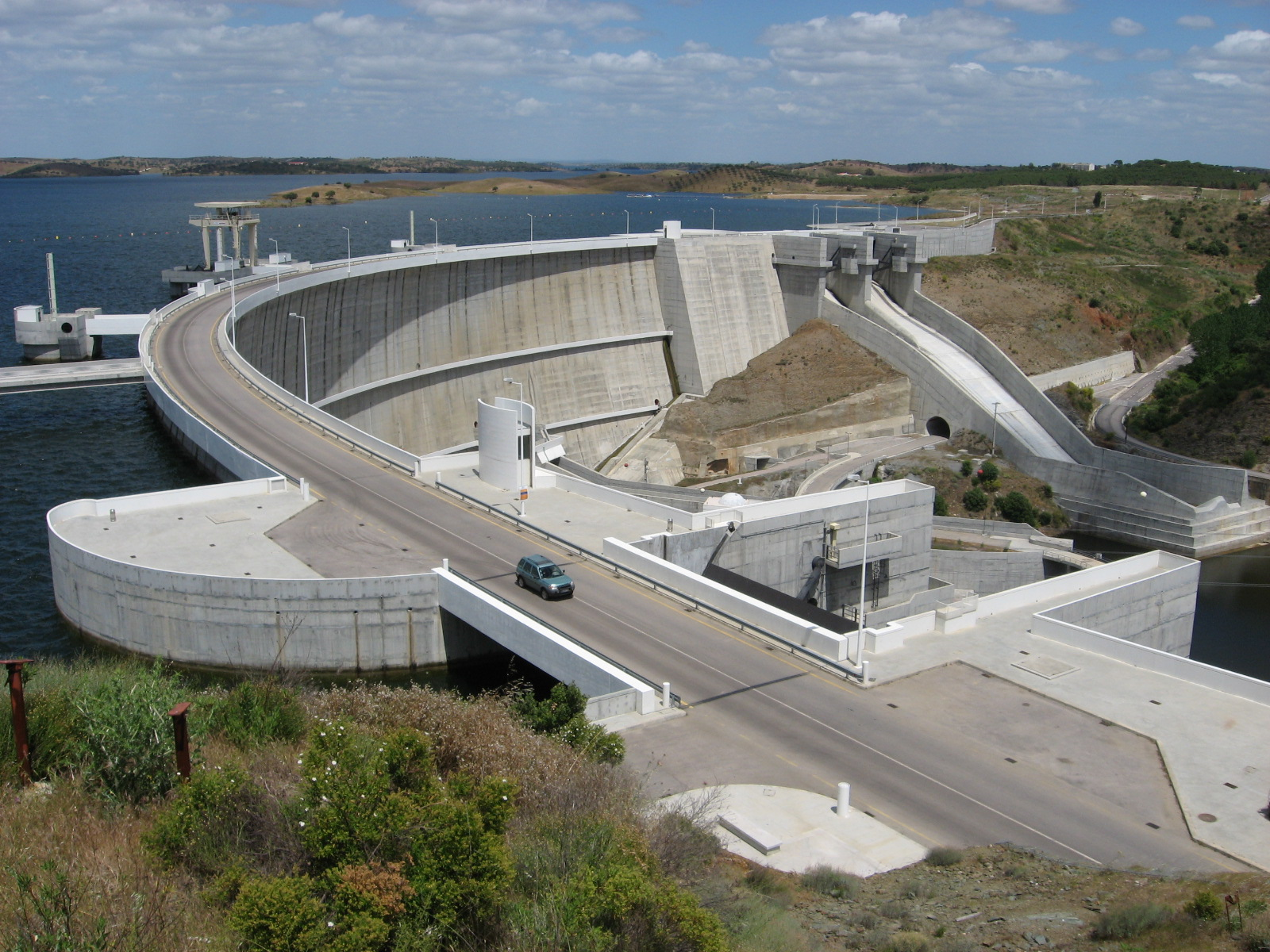
The Alqueva Dam, located in the southern arm of the Guadiana, is responsible for Western Europe's largest reservoir.

The Guadiana flows east to west through Spain and south through Portugal, then forms the Spanish-Portuguese border; it flows into the Gulf of Cádiz, part of the Atlantic Ocean, between Vila Real de Santo António (Portugal) and Ayamonte (Spain). It is 818 kilometres (508 mi) long, of which 578 kilometres (359 mi) are within Spanish territory, 140 kilometres (87 mi) within Portugal, while 100 kilometres (62 mi) are shared between the two nations. About 82 percent, 55,444 square kilometres (21,407 mi^{2}), of its basin is in Spain, while about 17 percent, 11,560 square kilometres (4,460 mi^{2}) is in Portugal.

=== Sources ===
The exact source of the river in Castilla-La Mancha is disputed, but it is generally believed to spring in the Ojos del Guadiana, Villarrubia de los Ojos municipal term, Ciudad Real Province, Castile–La Mancha, about 608 metres (1,995 ft) in elevation.

A classic theory introduced by Pliny the Elder was that the river originated from the Lagunas de Ruidera and divided into two branches: the Upper Guadiana (Spanish: Guadiana Viejo) and the Guadiana, while separated by a subterranean course. This legend developed from a misguided belief (which persisted until the 19th century) that the river appeared and disappeared over time, because of its subterranean tributary. In fact, no subterranean course exists, and the belief that the Lagunas de Ruidera is the source is also controversial. Toponymically and traditionally, the Upper Guadiana, which runs from Viveros (Albacete) until Argamasilla de Alba (Ciudad Real) had been identified as the main branch of the Guadiana. Even hydrogeological characteristics, though, indicate that the Upper Guadiana may not be the principal river within the system.

Another of the origin theories, postulated that the Cigüela and Zancara Rivers were the sources of the Guadiana. Today, they are considered integral parts of the river's headwaters and important tributaries, but not necessarily the exact origin. The Ciguela's source is in Altos de Cabreras (Cuenca) and pertains to the Sistema Ibérico, at an elevation of 1,080 metres (3,540 ft). Its course is 225 kilometres (140 mi) long, receiving contributions from the rivers Jualón, Torrejón, Riánsares, Amarguillo, and Záncara. The union of the rivers Ciguela and Záncara permits the replenishment of the waters in the Tablas de Daimiel National Park, a wetland that was designated for protection by the Spanish government in 1973 (situated in the municipalities of Villarrubia de los Ojos and Daimiel, in the province of Ciudad Real).

=== Course ===
From its origin/spring, it runs from the southern Iberian plain in a direction east to west, to near the town of Badajoz, where it begins to track south leading to the Gulf of Cádiz. The Guadiana marks the border of Spain and Portugal twice as it runs to the ocean: First, between the River Caia and Ribeira de Cuncos, then later from the River Chança until its mouth. The river is not used to completely mark the boundary between the two states; between the Olivença ravine and the Táliga ravine, the border still remains a disputed section claimed de jure by both countries and administered de facto by Spain (as part of the Spanish autonomous community of Extremadura).

For the most part, the Guadiana is navigable from the Atlantic Ocean until Mértola, a distance of 68 kilometres (42 mi). North of Mértola on the Guadiana is the highest waterfall is Southern Portugal called Pulo do Lobo.

The ecosystem has Mediterranean hydrological characteristics, including high variation in intra- and interannual discharge, large floods, and severe droughts. This variability is a consequence of considerable variation in rainwater supply averaging around an annual level of 400 to 600 millimetres (16 to 24 in). The climate is semiarid with an average annual temperature of 14 to 16 °C (57 to 61 °F).

== Estuary ==
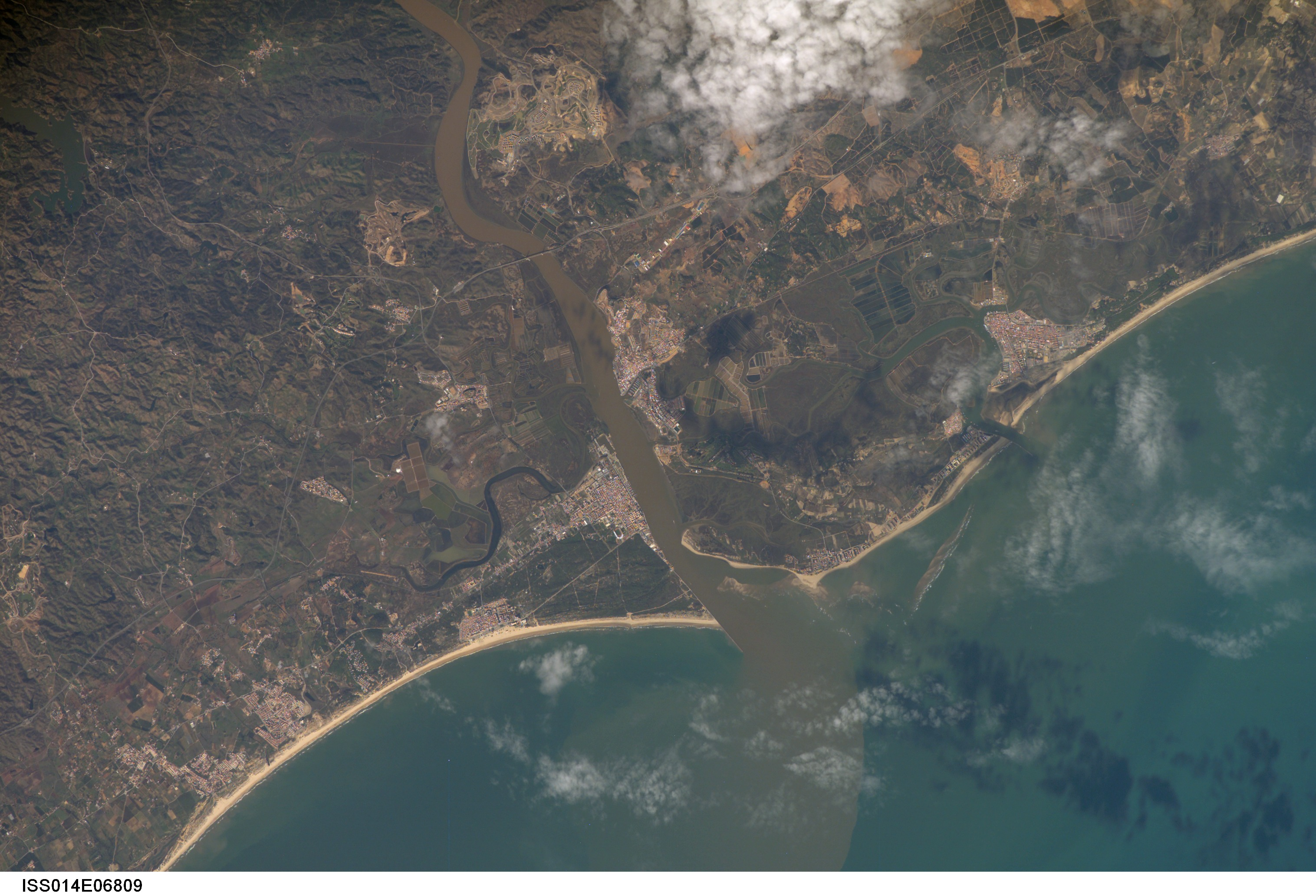
View of the mouth of the Guadiana as taken by ISS Expedition 14

The river empties into the Gulf of Cádiz between Ayamonte and Vila Real de Santo António, the two highly touristic regions of the Algarve and the sea-side of Andalusia. There, it forms a saltmarsh estuary, which has a maximum width of 550 metres (1,800 ft), and its depth ranges from 5 to 17 metres (16 to 56 ft). Tides are semidiurnal, ranging from 0.8 to 3.5 metres (2.6 to 11.5 ft); their upriver propagation is limited by falls situated 76 kilometres (47 mi) from the mouth at Moinho dos Canais. In the lower estuary, nature reserves cover a total of 2,089 hectares (5,160 acres); in Spain, the Marismas de Isla Cristina and, in Portugal, the Reserva Natural do Sapal de Castro Marim e Vila Real de Santo António (English: Castro Marim and Vila Real de Santo António Marsh Natural Reserve); they give a valued nature-conservation character to the region.

=== Human impact ===
In Spain, three autonomous communities, (Castilla-La Mancha, Extremadura, and Andalusia, comprising the provinces of Ciudad Real, Badajoz, and Huelva) are crossed by the Guadiana. Meanwhile in Portugal, the river crosses the regions of Alentejo and Algarve, and the districts of Portalegre, Évora, Beja, and Faro.

==== Dams ====
Over 30 dams are on the river basin. These are the dams on the Guadiana River itself:

- Alqueva Dam, the largest dam, located near Moura, in the Beja District, is responsible for the largest reservoir in Western Europe. (Several larger ones are in Russia and Ukraine.) The Alqueva Reservoir occupies an area of 250 square kilometres (97 mi^{2}), with a capacity for 4,150 cubic hectometres (3,360,000 acre⋅ft).
- García Sola Reservoir
- Cíjara Reservoir
- El Vicario Reservoir
- Orellana Reservoir

== See also ==
- List of rivers of Spain
- Tablas de Daimiel
- Pulo do Lobo
