= Ibort =

Coordinates: 42.4774°N 0.4059°W

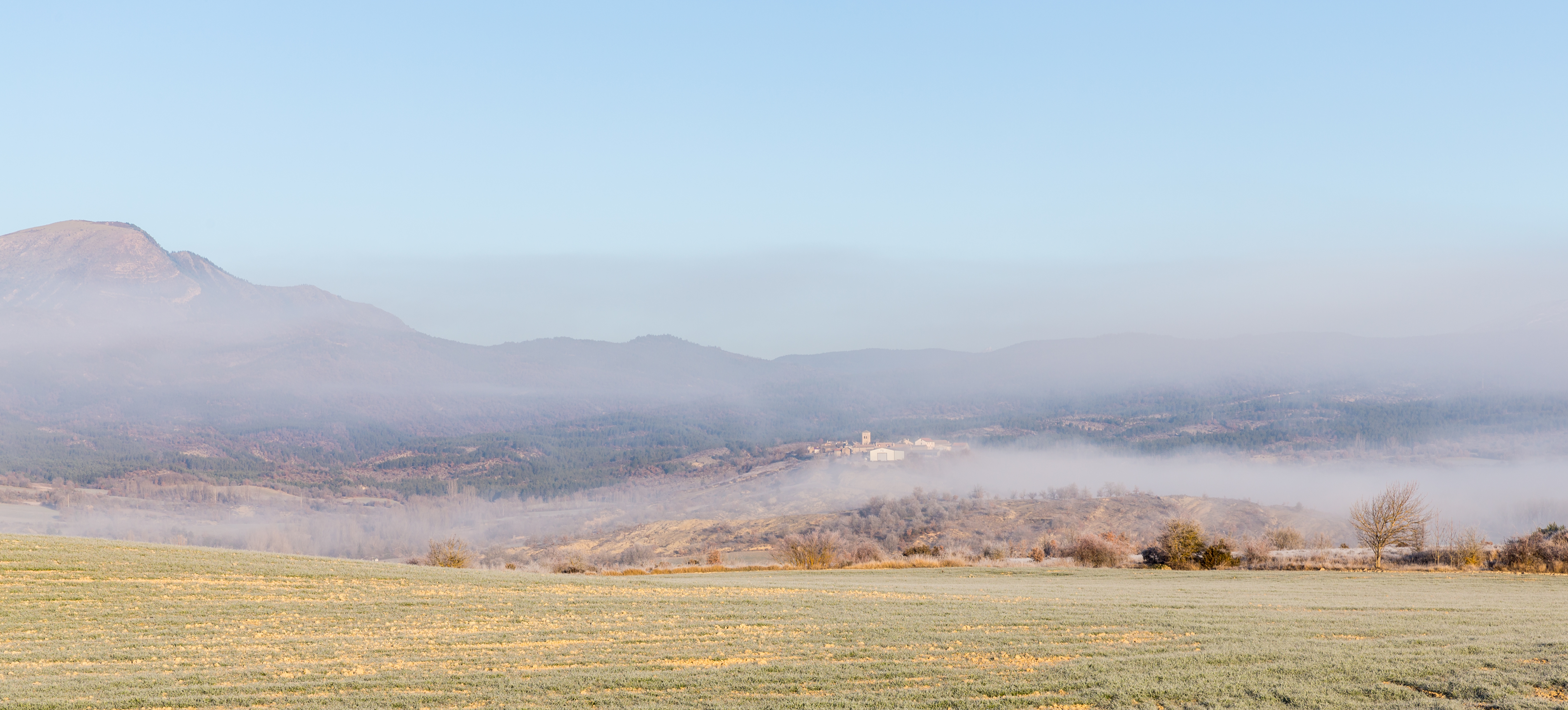
- Interactive map of Ibort
- Country: Spain
- Province: Huesca
- Municipality: Sabiñánigo

Population (2013)
  - Total: 68

Ibort (Aragonese: Ibor) is a village under the local government of the municipality of Sabiñánigo, Alto Gállego, Huesca, Aragon, Spain.

== History ==
In the 16th century, the original location of Ibor was abandoned because of soil stability problems while relocating to its current location.
