= Viveros =

Coordinates: 38°47′N 2°35′W

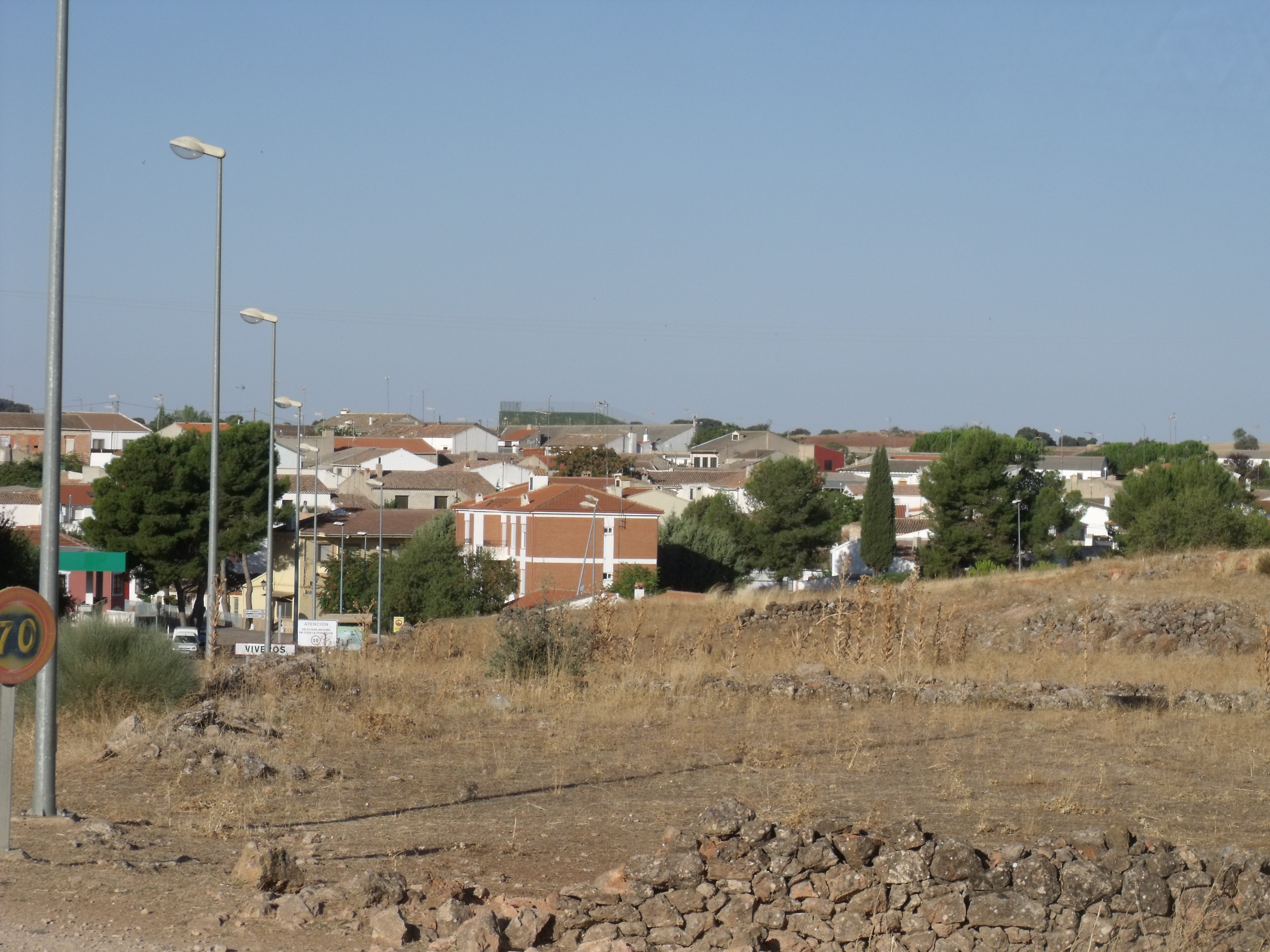
View of Viveros

Coat of arms of Viveros

Viveros is a municipality in Albacete, Castile-La Mancha, Spain. It has a population of 512.
