= List of sovereign states in the 1980s =

This is a list of sovereign states in the 1980s, giving an overview of states around the world during the period between 1 January 1980 and 31 December 1989. It contains 188 entries, arranged alphabetically, with information on the status and recognition of their sovereignty. It includes 171 widely recognized sovereign states, 2 constituent republics of another sovereign state that were UN members on their own right, 2 associated states, and 13 entities that claim an effective sovereignty but are considered de facto dependencies of other powers by the general international community.

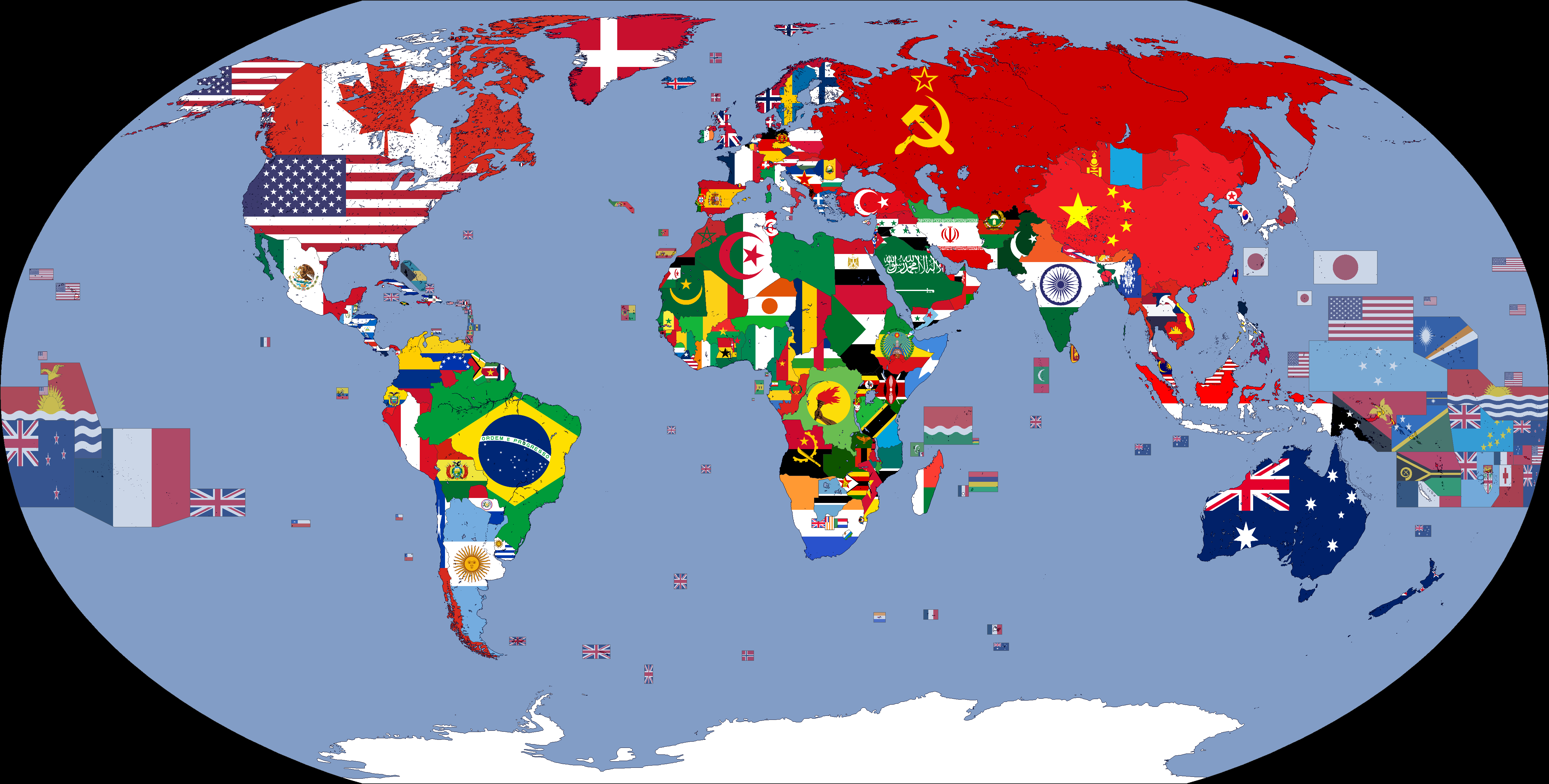
Map of the world in the 1980s

== Sovereign states ==
Name and capital city	Information on status and recognition of sovereignty
=== A ===
→ → Afghanistan; Capital: Kabul: Democratic Republic of Afghanistan (to 30 November 1987) (Note: "Democratic" was dropped from the state's official name when a new constitution of Afghanistan was enacted by loya jirga on 30 November 1987.); Republic of Afghanistan (from 30 November 1987)	Widely recognized UN member state. Afghanistan was occupied by the Soviet Union (to 15 February 1989).
Albania – People's Socialist Republic of Albania; Capital: Tirana	Widely recognized UN member state.
Algeria – People's Democratic Republic of Algeria; Capital: Algiers	Widely recognized UN member state.
Andorra – Principality of Andorra; Capital: Andorra la Vella	Widely recognized independent state. The President of France and Bishop of Urgell were ex officio Co-Princes of Andorra. The defense of Andorra was the responsibility of France and Spain.
Angola – People's Republic of Angola; Capital: Luanda	Widely recognized UN member state.
Antigua and Barbuda; Capital: St. John's: Antigua (to 31 October 1981); Antigua and Barbuda (from 1 November 1981) (Note: Antigua and Barbuda gained independence from the United Kingdom on 1 November 1981.)	Associated state of the United Kingdom (to 31 October 1981); widely recognized independent state (from 1 November 1981). UN member state (from 11 November 1981); Commonwealth realm. Antigua and Barbuda had two dependencies: Barbuda and Redonda.
Argentina – Argentine Republic (Note: The name "Argentine Nation" was also used for the purposes of legislation.); Capital: Buenos Aires	Widely recognized UN member state. Argentina was a federation of 22 provinces and two federal territories. (Note: 23 provinces: Buenos Aires, Catamarca, Chaco, Chubut, Córdoba, Corrientes, Entre Ríos, Formosa, Jujuy, La Pampa, La Rioja, Mendoza, Misiones, Neuquén, Río Negro, Salta, San Juan, San Luis, Santa Cruz, Santa Fe, Santiago del Estero, Tucumán. 2 territories: Buenos Aires, Tierra del Fuego.) It had a claim over Argentine Antarctica, which was suspended under the Antarctic Treaty. It also claimed the Falkland Islands and South Georgia and the South Sandwich Islands, both of which were British overseas territories.
Australia – Commonwealth of Australia; Capital: Canberra	Widely recognized UN member state; Commonwealth realm. Australia was a federation of six states and three territories. (Note: 6 states: New South Wales, Queensland, South Australia, Tasmania, Victoria, Western Australia. 3 territories: Australian Capital Territory, Jervis Bay Territory, Northern Territory.) It had sovereignty over the following external territories: (Australia) Ashmore and Cartier Islands; (Australia) Australian Antarctic Territory (suspended under the Antarctic Treaty.); Christmas Island; Cocos (Keeling) Islands; (Australia) Coral Sea Islands; (Australia) Heard Island and McDonald Islands; Norfolk Island
Austria – Republic of Austria; Capital: Vienna	Widely recognized UN member state. Austria was a federation of nine states. (Note: 9 states: Burgenland, Carinthia, Lower Austria, Salzburg, Styria, Tyrol, Upper Austria, Vorarlberg, Vienna.)
=== B ===
The Bahamas – Commonwealth of the Bahamas; Capital: Nassau	Widely recognized UN member state; Commonwealth realm.
Bahrain – State of Bahrain; Capital: Manama	Widely recognized UN member state.
Bangladesh – People's Republic of Bangladesh; Capital: Dhaka	Widely recognized UN member state.
Barbados; Capital: Bridgetown	Widely recognized UN member state; Commonwealth realm.
Belgium – Kingdom of Belgium; Capital: Brussels	Widely recognized UN member state. EEC member.
Belize (from 21 September 1981) (Note: Belize gained independence from the United Kingdom on 21 September 1981.); Capital: Belmopan	Widely recognized independent state. (Note: Belize was not recognized by Guatemala.) UN member state (from 25 September 1981); Commonwealth realm.
Benin – People's Republic of Benin; Capital: Porto-Novo (official), Cotonou (seat of government)	Widely recognized UN member state.
Bhutan – Kingdom of Bhutan; Capital: Thimphu	Widely recognized UN member state. Bhutan was officially guided by India in its foreign affairs, but effectively pursued an independent foreign policy.
Bolivia; Capital: Sucre (official), La Paz (administrative)	Widely recognized UN member state.
Botswana – Republic of Botswana; Capital: Gaborone	Widely recognized UN member state.
Brazil – Federative Republic of Brazil; Capital: Brasília	Widely recognized UN member state. Brazil was a federation of 26 states, four territories (none from 1 January 1989), and one federal district. (Note: 26 states: Acre, Alagoas, Amapá (from 1 January 1989), Amazonas, Bahia, Ceará, Espírito Santo, Goiás, Maranhão, Mato Grosso, Mato Grosso do Sul, Minas Gerais, Pará, Paraíba, Paraná, Pernambuco, Piauí, Rio Grande do Norte, Rio Grande do Sul, Rio de Janeiro, Rondônia (from 22 December 1981), Roraima (from 1 January 1989), Santa Catarina, São Paulo, Sergipe, Tocantins (from 1 January 1989). 4 territories: Amapá (to 1 January 1989), Fernando de Noronha (to 1 January 1989), Rondônia (to 22 December 1981), Roraima (to 1 January 1989). 1 federal district: Federal District.)
Brunei – State of Brunei, Abode of Peace (from 1 January 1984) (Note: The British Protectorate over Brunei came to an end on 1 January 1984.); Capital: Bandar Seri Begawan	Widely recognized independent state. UN member state (from 21 September 1984). Brunei claimed part of the Spratly Islands (disputed by China, Taiwan, Vietnam, the Philippines, and Malaysia).
Bulgaria – People's Republic of Bulgaria; Capital: Sofia	Widely recognized UN member state.
Burkina Faso → Upper Volta
Burma / Myanmar; Capital: Rangoon (renamed Yangon in 1989): Socialist Republic of the Union of Burma (to 18 September 1988) (Note: The State Law and Order Restoration Council suspended the constitution of the Socialist Republic of the Union of Burma on 18 September 1988.); Union of Burma (from 18 September 1988 to 18 June 1989) (Note: The State Law and Order Restoration Council renamed Burma to Myanmar on 18 June 1989. This change was not internationally recognized, and the country's common name in English remained "Burma".); Union of Myanmar (from 18 June 1989)	Widely recognized UN member state.
→ Burundi – Republic of Burundi; Capital: Bujumbura	Widely recognized UN member state.
=== C ===
Cambodia, State of → Kampuchea, People's Republic of
Cameroon; Capital: Yaoundé: United Republic of Cameroon (to 4 February 1984) (Note: Cameroon was renamed when its new constitution came into effect on 4 February 1984.); Republic of Cameroon (from 4 February 1984)	Widely recognized UN member state.
Canada; Capital: Ottawa: Dominion of Canada (to 17 April 1982); Canada (from 17 April 1982)	Widely recognized UN member state; Commonwealth realm. Canada was a federation of ten provinces and two territories. (Note: 10 provinces: Alberta, British Columbia, Manitoba, New Brunswick, Newfoundland, Nova Scotia, Ontario, Prince Edward Island, Quebec, Saskatchewan. 2 territories: Northwest Territories, Yukon.)
Cape Verde – Republic of Cape Verde; Capital: Praia	Widely recognized UN member state.
Central African Republic; Capital: Bangui	Widely recognized UN member state.
Chad – Republic of Chad; Capital: N'Djamena	Widely recognized UN member state.
Chile – Republic of Chile; Capital: Santiago	Widely recognized UN member state. It had a claim over Chilean Antarctic Territory, which is suspended under the Antarctic Treaty.
China, People's Republic of Capital: Beijing	Widely recognized UN member state. (Note: The People's Republic of China and the Republic of China did not recognize each other, as both states claimed to be the sole legitimate government of China. The following states recognized the ROC instead of the PRC: Bahamas (from 1989), Belize (from 11 October 1989), Bolivia (to 9 July 1985), Colombia (to 7 February 1980), Costa Rica, Dominica (from 1983), Dominican Republic, Ecuador (to 2 January 1980), El Salvador, Guatemala, Grenada (from 19 July 1989), Haiti, Honduras, South Korea, Lesotho (30 April 1983), Liberia (from 9 October 1989), Malawi, Monaco, Nauru (from 1980), Panama, Paraguay, Saint Kitts and Nevis, Saint Lucia, Saint Vincent and the Grenadines (from 1981), Saudi Arabia, Solomon Islands (from 1983), South Africa, Swaziland, Tonga, Tuvalu, the United Arab Emirates (from 1 November 1984), Uruguay (to 3 February 1988), and Vatican City.) The People's Republic of China had five autonomous regions: Guangxi, Inner Mongolia, Ningxia, Xinjiang and Tibet. The People's Republic of China claimed Taiwan, Kinmen, the Matsu Islands, Pratas Island and the Vereker Banks, and Itu Aba, all of which were governed by the Republic of China. It also claimed the Paracel Islands (disputed by the Republic of China and Vietnam), the Spratly Islands (disputed by the Republic of China, Vietnam, the Philippines, Malaysia and Brunei), and South Tibet (controlled by India). The People's Republic of China administered Aksai Chin and the Trans-Karakoram Tract, which were within the disputed region of Kashmir.
Colombia – Republic of Colombia; Capital: Bogotá	Widely recognized UN member state. Colombia administered Bajo Nuevo Bank and Serranilla Bank (disputed by Nicaragua and the United States).
Comoros – Federal Islamic Republic of the Comoros; Capital: Moroni	Widely recognized UN member state. The Comoros was a federation of three islands. (Note: 3 islands: Anjouan, Grande Comore, Mohéli.) Comoros claimed sovereignty over the French overseas territories of Mayotte and the Glorioso Islands. It also claimed Banc du Geyser (disputed by Madagascar and France).
Congo – People's Republic of the Congo; Capital: Brazzaville	Widely recognized UN member state.
Costa Rica – Republic of Costa Rica; Capital: San José	Widely recognized UN member state.
Cuba – Republic of Cuba; Capital: Havana	Widely recognized UN member state. The Cuban area of Guantánamo Bay was under the control of the United States.
Cyprus – Republic of Cyprus; Capital: Nicosia	Widely recognized UN member state. (Note: Cyprus was not recognized by Turkey or Northern Cyprus.) Cyprus included one self-declared state which, although it did not claim independence, was de facto self-governing: Turkish Federated State of Cyprus (to 15 November 1983); After 15 November 1983, The northeastern part of the island was the de facto independent state of Northern Cyprus, recognized only by Turkey.
Czechoslovakia – Czechoslovak Socialist Republic; Capital: Prague	Widely recognized UN member state. (Note: Owing to a dispute over lands seized during World War II, Liechtenstein and Czechoslovakia did not recognize each other.) Czechoslovakia was a federation of two republics. (Note: 2 republics: Czech Socialist Republic, Slovak Socialist Republic.)
=== D ===
Denmark – Kingdom of Denmark; Capital: Copenhagen	Widely recognized UN member state; EEC member. The Danish Realm also included two of its constituent countries: Greenland; Faroe Islands
Derg → Ethiopia
Djibouti – Republic of Djibouti; Capital: Djibouti	Widely recognized UN member state.
→ → Dominica – Commonwealth of Dominica; Capital: Roseau	Widely recognized UN member state.
Dominican Republic; Capital: Santo Domingo	Widely recognized UN member state.
=== E ===
Ecuador – Republic of Ecuador; Capital: Quito	Widely recognized UN member state.
→ Egypt – Arab Republic of Egypt; Capital: Cairo	Widely recognized UN member state. Egypt included the Sinai Peninsula, which was occupied by Israel until 25 April 1982.
El Salvador; Capital: San Salvador: Revolutionary Government Junta (to 2 May 1982); Republic of El Salvador (from 2 May 1982)	Widely recognized UN member state.
Equatorial Guinea – Republic of Equatorial Guinea; Capital: Malabo	Widely recognized UN member state.
→ Ethiopia; Capital: Addis Ababa: Provisional Military Government of Socialist Ethiopia (Derg or Socialist Ethiopia) (to 22 February 1987) (Note: Ethiopia enacted a new constitution on 22 February 1987.); People's Democratic Republic of Ethiopia (from 22 February 1987)	Widely recognized UN member state.
=== F ===
Fiji; Capital: Suva: Dominion of Fiji (to 7 October 1987) (Note: Following a military coup, Fiji was declared a republic on 7 October 1987.); Republic of Fiji (from 7 October 1987)	Widely recognized UN member state; Commonwealth realm (to 7 October 1987). Fiji had an autonomous dependency, Rotuma.
Finland – Republic of Finland; Capital: Helsinki	Widely recognized UN member state. Finland had a neutral and demilitarised region: Åland
France – French Republic; Capital: Paris	Widely recognized UN member state. EEC member. France included five overseas departments: French Guiana, Guadeloupe, Martinique, Réunion, and Saint Pierre and Miquelon (to 11 June 1985). It also had sovereignty over the following overseas territories: French Polynesia, with one dependency: Clipperton Island; French Southern and Antarctic Lands (including a claim to Adélie Land which was suspended under the Antarctic Treaty.); Mayotte; New Caledonia; New Hebrides (to 29 July 1980, jointly with the United Kingdom); Saint Pierre and Miquelon (from 11 June 1985); The Scattered Islands in the Indian Ocean, consisting of five uninhabited possessions: Bassas da India (disputed by Madagascar); Europa Island (disputed by Madagascar); Glorioso Islands (disputed by Madagascar, Comoros, and the Seychelles); Juan de Nova Island (disputed by Madagascar); Tromelin Island (disputed by Mauritius and the Seychelles); Wallis and Futuna; France also claimed Banc du Geyser (disputed by Madagascar and the Comoros).
=== G ===
Gabon – Gabonese Republic; Capital: Libreville	Widely recognized UN member state.
The Gambia – Republic of the Gambia; Capital: Banjul	Widely recognized UN member state.
Germany, East – German Democratic Republic; Capital: East Berlin (disputed)	Widely recognized UN member state.
Germany, West – Federal Republic of Germany; Capital: Bonn	Widely recognized UN member state. EEC member. West Germany was a federation of ten states. (Note: 10 states: Baden-Württemberg, Bavaria, Bremen, Hamburg, Hesse, Lower Saxony, North Rhine-Westphalia, Rhineland-Palatinate, Saarland, and Schleswig-Holstein.)
Ghana – Republic of Ghana; Capital: Accra	Widely recognized UN member state.
Greece – Hellenic Republic; Capital: Athens	Widely recognized UN member state. EEC member (from 1 January 1981). Greece had sovereignty over Mount Athos, an autonomous monastic state that was jointly governed by the multi-national "Holy Community" on the mountain and the Civil Governor appointed by the Greek Ministry of Foreign Affairs, and spiritually came under the direct jurisdiction of the Ecumenical Patriarchate.
Grenada; Capital: St. George's: People's Revolutionary Government of Grenada (to 25 October 1983) (Note: The United States invaded Grenada on 25 October 1983, removing the PRG regime from power and restored the pre-1979 government.); Grenada (from 25 October 1983)	Widely recognized UN member state; Commonwealth realm. Grenada had one autonomous dependency, Carriacou and Petite Martinique.
Guatemala – Republic of Guatemala; Capital: Guatemala City	Widely recognized UN member state.
Guinea; Capital: Conakry: People's Revolutionary Republic of Guinea (to 25 May 1984); Republic of Guinea (from 25 May 1984)	Widely recognized UN member state.
Guinea-Bissau – Republic of Guinea-Bissau; Capital: Bissau	Widely recognized UN member state.
Guyana – Co-operative Republic of Guyana; Capital: Georgetown	Widely recognized UN member state.
=== H ===
→ Haiti – Republic of Haiti; Capital: Port-au-Prince: Duvalier dynasty (to 7 February 1986); Third Haitian Republic (from 7 February 1986)	Widely recognized UN member state. Haiti claimed the uninhabited United States possession of Navassa Island.
Holy See → Vatican City
Honduras; Capital: Tegucigalpa: Republic of Honduras (to January 27, 1982); Republic of Honduras (from January 27, 1982)	Widely recognized UN member state.
Hungary; Capital: Budapest: People's Republic of Hungary (to 23 October 1989) (Note: The name "People's Republic of Hungary" was abandoned on 23 October 1989.); Republic of Hungary (from 23 October 1989)	Widely recognized UN member state.
=== I ===
Iceland – Republic of Iceland; Capital: Reykjavík	Widely recognized UN member state.
India – Republic of India; Capital: New Delhi	Widely recognized UN member state. India was a federation of twenty-eight states and ten union territories. (Note: 25 states: Andhra Pradesh, Arunachal Pradesh (from 20 February 1987), Assam, Bihar, Goa (from 30 May 1987), Gujarat, Haryana, Himachal Pradesh, Jammu and Kashmir, Karnataka, Kerala, Madhya Pradesh, Maharashtra, Manipur, Meghalaya, Mizoram (from 1986), Nagaland, Orissa, Punjab, Rajasthan, Sikkim, Tamil Nadu, Tripura, Uttar Pradesh, West Bengal. 10 Union Territories: Arunachal Pradesh (to 20 February 1987), Andaman and Nicobar Islands, Chandigarh, Dadra and Nagar Haveli, Daman and Diu (from 30 May 1987), Goa, Daman and Diu (to 30 May 1987), Lakshadweep, Mizoram (to 1986), National Capital Territory of Delhi, and Pondicherry.) Indian sovereignty over South Tibet was disputed by China. India administered part of the disputed region of Kashmir as the state of Jammu and Kashmir.
Indonesia – Republic of Indonesia; Capital: Jakarta	Widely recognized UN member state.
→ → Iran – Islamic Republic of Iran; Capital: Tehran	Widely recognized UN member state.
Iraq – Iraqi Republic; Capital: Baghdad	Widely recognized UN member state.
Ireland (Note: Ireland also had the legal description of "Republic of Ireland", although this was not its constitutional name.); Capital: Dublin	Widely recognized UN member state. EEC member.
Israel – State of Israel; Capital: Jerusalem	Widely recognized UN member state. (Note: Israel was not recognized by Afghanistan, Algeria, Bahrain, Bangladesh, Chad, Cuba, Indonesia, Iran, Iraq, Jordan, Kuwait, Lebanon, Libya, Malaysia, North Korea, Pakistan, Saudi Arabia, Sudan, Syria, the United Arab Emirates, or Yemen.) Israel occupied the Gaza Strip the Golan Heights, the Israeli Security Zone in Southern Lebanon (from 6 June 1982), the Sinai Peninsula (to 25 April 1982), and the West Bank, including East Jerusalem. These areas were not recognized as being part of Israel.
Italy – Italian Republic; Capital: Rome	Widely recognized UN member state; EEC member. Italy had 5 autonomous regions and they were the Aosta Valley, Friuli-Venezia Giulia, Sardinia, Sicily, and Trentino-Alto Adige/Südtirol.
Ivory Coast; Capital: Yamoussoukro (official, from 21 March 1983), Abidjan (seat of government): Republic of Ivory Coast (to 12 October 1985) (Note: The official French name of Ivory Coast had been "République de Côte d'Ivoire" since its independence in 1960, but English sources typically translated the name as "Republic of Ivory Coast". On 12 October 1985, the Ivorian government officially requested that the name be translated as "Republic of Côte d'Ivoire".); Republic of Côte d'Ivoire (from 12 October 1985)	Widely recognized UN member state.
=== J ===
Jamaica; Capital: Kingston	Widely recognized UN member state; Commonwealth realm.
Japan; Capital: Tokyo	Widely recognized UN member state.
Jordan – Hashemite Kingdom of Jordan; Capital: Amman	Widely recognized UN member state. Until 31 July 1988, Jordan claimed West Bank, including East Jerusalem, which were Israeli-occupied territories.
=== K ===
Kampuchea, Democratic; Capital: Phnom Penh: Democratic Kampuchea (to 22 June 1982) (Note: The Coalition Government of Democratic Kampuchea was established on 22 June 1982.); Coalition Government of Democratic Kampuchea (from 22 June 1982)	Widely recognized UN member state. (Note: Although the People's Republic of Kampuchea had near total control over the territory of Cambodia, the majority of the states in the world recognized the former government of Democratic Kampuchea, which retained Cambodia's UN membership. The People's Republic of Kampuchea was mainly recognized by Vietnam and states within the Soviet sphere of influence.) Claimed to be the sole legitimate government of Kampuchea, despite being in exile.
Kenya – Republic of Kenya; Capital: Nairobi	Widely recognized UN member state.
Kiribati – Republic of Kiribati; Capital: South Tarawa	Widely recognized independent state.
Korea, North – Democratic People's Republic of Korea; Capital: Pyongyang	Widely recognized independent state. (Note: North Korea was not recognized by Estonia, France, Japan, or South Korea.) Permanent observer at the UN; claimed to be the sole legitimate government of Korea.
→ Korea, South - Republic of Korea; Capital: Seoul: Fourth Republic (to 25 February 1981); Fifth Republic (from 25 February 1981 to 25 February 1988); Sixth Republic (from 25 February 1988)	Widely recognized independent state. (Note: South Korea was not recognized by the Soviet Union, China, Romania or North Korea.) Permanent observer at the UN; claimed to be the sole legitimate government of Korea.
Kuwait – State of Kuwait; Capital: Kuwait City	Widely recognized UN member state.
=== L ===
Laos – Lao People's Democratic Republic; Capital: Vientiane	Widely recognized UN member state.
Lebanon – Lebanese Republic; Capital: Beirut	Widely recognized UN member state; Lebanon was occupied by Syria. Some of Southern Lebanon was occupied by Israel (from 6 June 1982).
→ Lesotho – Kingdom of Lesotho; Capital: Maseru	Widely recognized UN member state.
Liberia – Republic of Liberia; Capital: Monrovia	Widely recognized UN member state.
Libya; Capital: Tripoli: Socialist People's Libyan Arab Jamahiriya (to 15 April 1986) (Note: Following an U.S. air strike against the Libyan regime, the word "Great" was added to the Libyan state's official name.); Great Socialist People's Libyan Arab Jamahiriya (from 15 April 1986)	Widely recognized UN member state.
→ Liechtenstein – Principality of Liechtenstein; Capital: Vaduz	Widely recognized independent state. The defense of Liechtenstein was the responsibility of Switzerland.
Luxembourg – Grand Duchy of Luxembourg; Capital: Luxembourg	Widely recognized UN member state. EEC member.
=== M ===
Madagascar – Democratic Republic of Madagascar; Capital: Antananarivo	Widely recognized UN member state. Madagascar claimed the French possessions of Bassas da India, Europa Island, Glorioso Islands and Juan de Nova Island. It also claimed Banc du Geyser (disputed by Comoros and France)
Malawi – Republic of Malawi; Capital: Lilongwe	Widely recognized UN member state.
Malaysia - Federation of Malaysia; Capital: Kuala Lumpur	Widely recognized UN member state. Malaysia was a federation of thirteen states and two federal territories. (Note: 13 states: Johor, Kedah, Kelantan, Malacca, Negeri Sembilan, Pahang, Perak, Perlis, Penang, Sabah, Sarawak, Selangor, Terengganu. 2 Federal Territories: Kuala Lumpur, Labuan (from 16 April 1984).) Malaysia claimed part of the Spratly Islands (disputed by the People's Republic of China, the Republic of China, Vietnam, the Philippines, and Brunei).
Maldives – Republic of Maldives; Capital: Malé	Widely recognized UN member state.
Mali – Republic of Mali; Capital: Bamako	Widely recognized UN member state.
Malta – Republic of Malta; Capital: Valletta	Widely recognized UN member state.
Marshall Islands – Republic of the Marshall Islands (from 21 October 1986) (Note: The UN Trusteeship over the Marshall Islands came to an end on 21 October 1986.); Capital: Majuro	Widely recognized state under Compact of Free Association with the United States. The Marshall Islands claimed the United States territory of Wake Island.
Mauritania – Islamic Republic of Mauritania; Capital: Nouakchott	Widely recognized UN member state.
Mauritius; Capital: Port Louis	Widely recognized UN member state; Commonwealth realm. Mauritius had three dependencies: Agalega Islands, Cargados Carajos and Rodrigues. It claimed the British Indian Ocean Territory and the French territory of Tromelin Island.
Mexico – United Mexican States; Capital: Mexico City	Widely recognized UN member state. Mexico was a federation of 31 states and one federal district. (Note: 31 states: Aguascalientes, Baja California, Baja California Sur, Campeche, Chiapas, Chihuahua, Coahuila, Colima, Durango, Guanajuato, Guerrero, Hidalgo, Jalisco, México, Michoacán, Morelos, Nayarit, Nuevo León, Oaxaca, Puebla, Querétaro, Quintana Roo, San Luis Potosí, Sinaloa, Sonora, Tabasco, Tamaulipas, Tlaxcala, Veracruz, Yucatán, and Zacatecas. 1 federal district: Federal District.)
Federated States of Micronesia (from 3 November 1986) (Note: The date the UN Trusteeship over Micronesia came to an end on.); Capital: Kolonia (to 1989) Palikir (from 1989)	Widely recognized state under Compact of Free Association with the United States. The FSM was a federation of four states. (Note: 4 states: Chuuk, Kosrae, Pohnpei, Yap.)
Monaco – Principality of Monaco; Capital: Monaco	Widely recognized independent state. Permanent observer at the UN.The defense of Monaco was the responsibility of France.
Mongolia – Mongolian People's Republic; Capital: Ulaanbaatar	Widely recognized UN member state.
Morocco – Kingdom of Morocco; Capital: Rabat	Widely recognized UN member state. Morocco claimed sovereignty over and controlled most of the disputed Western Sahara, which was home to the de facto independent Sahrawi Arab Democratic Republic. Morocco disputed the Spanish sovereignty over Ceuta, Isla de Alborán, Isla Perejil, Islas Chafarinas, Melilla, and Peñón de Alhucemas.
→ → Mozambique – People's Republic of Mozambique; Capital: Maputo	Widely recognized UN member state.
Myanmar → Burma
=== N ===
Nauru – Republic of Nauru; Capital: Yaren (unofficial)	Widely recognized independent state. The defense of Nauru was the responsibility of Australia.
Nepal – Kingdom of Nepal; Capital: Kathmandu	Widely recognized UN member state.
Netherlands – Kingdom of the Netherlands; Capital: Amsterdam (official), The Hague (seat of government)	Widely recognized UN member state. The Kingdom of the Netherlands consisted of three autonomous countries: Aruba (from 1 January 1986); Netherlands; → Netherlands Antilles; The Kingdom of the Netherlands as a whole was a member of the EEC, but Aruba and the Netherlands Antilles were not.
New Zealand; Capital: Wellington: Dominion of New Zealand (to 1 January 1987) (Note: The Constitution Act 1986 came into force on 1 January 1987, officially removing the phrase "Dominion of New Zealand" from use.); New Zealand (from 1 January 1987)	Widely recognized UN member state; Commonwealth realm. New Zealand had responsibilities for the two free associated states of: Cook Islands; Niue; It also had sovereignty over two dependent territories: Ross Dependency (suspended under the Antarctic Treaty); Tokelau; The government of Tokelau claimed Swains Island, part of American Samoa (a U.S. dependence). New Zealand did not recognize this claim since 25 March 1981.
Nicaragua; Capital: Managua: Junta of National Reconstruction (to 10 January 1985); Republic of Nicaragua (from 10 January 1985)	Widely recognized UN member state. Nicaragua had two autonomous regions: Región Autónoma del Atlántico Norte (from 1987) and Región Autónoma del Atlántico Sur (from 1987).
Niger – Republic of Niger; Capital: Niamey	Widely recognized UN member state.
Nigeria; Capital: Lagos: Second Nigerian Republic (to 31 December 1983); Military dictatorship (from 31 December 1983)	Widely recognized UN member state. Nigeria was a federation of 21 states and one federal territory. (Note: 21 states: Akwa Ibom (from 23 September 1987), Anambra, Bauchi, Bendel, Benue, Borno, Cross River, Gongola, Imo, Kaduna, Kano, Katsina (from 23 September 1987), Kwara, Lagos, Niger, Ogun, Ondo, Oyo, Plateau, Rivers, and Sokoto. 1 federal territory: Federal Capital Territory.)
Norway – Kingdom of Norway; Capital: Oslo	Widely recognized UN member state. Norway had two integral overseas areas: Jan Mayen and Svalbard. The latter of area had a special status due to the Spitsbergen Treaty. Norway had sovereignty over the following dependencies: Bouvet Island; Peter I Island (suspended under the Antarctic Treaty); Queen Maud Land (suspended under the Antarctic Treaty)
=== O ===
Oman – Sultanate of Oman; Capital: Muscat	Widely recognized UN member state.
=== P ===
Pakistan – Islamic Republic of Pakistan; Capital: Islamabad	Widely recognized UN member state. Pakistan was a federation of four provinces and four territories; it administered part of the disputed region of Kashmir as the territories of Azad Kashmir and the Northern Areas. (Note: 4 provinces: Balochistan, North-West Frontier Province, Punjab, Sindh. 4 territories: Azad Kashmir, Federally Administered Tribal Areas, Islamabad Capital Territory, Northern Areas.)
Panama – Republic of Panama; Capital: Panama City	Widely recognized UN member state.
Papua New Guinea – Independent State of Papua New Guinea; Capital: Port Moresby	Widely recognized UN member state; Commonwealth realm.
→ Paraguay – Republic of Paraguay; Capital: Asunción	Widely recognized UN member state.
Peru; Capital: Lima: Peruvian Republic (to 28 July 1980) (Note: Peru enacted a new constitution on 28 July 1980.); Republic of Peru (from 28 July 1980)	Widely recognized UN member state.
→ → Philippines; Capital: Manila: Philippines under martial law (to 30 June 1981); Fourth Republic of the Philippines (from 30 June 1981 to 25 February 1986); Provisional Government of the Philippines (from 25 February 1986 to 2 February 1987); Fifth Republic of the Philippines (from 2 February 1987)	Widely recognized UN member state. The Philippines had one autonomous region: Muslim Mindanao (from 1 August 1989). The Philippines administered Scarborough Shoal, which was disputed by the People's Republic of China and the Republic of China. It also claimed sovereignty over the Spratly Islands (disputed by the People's Republic of China, the Republic of China, Vietnam, Brunei, and Malaysia) and the Malaysian territory of Sabah.
→ Poland; Capital: Warsaw: Polish People's Republic (to 29 December 1989) (Note: Poland's constitution was amended on 29 December 1989, changing the official name of the state from "People's Republic of Poland" to "Republic of Poland".); Republic of Poland (from 29 December 1989)	Widely recognized UN member state. Poland's government was still in exile.
Portugal – Portuguese Republic; Capital: Lisbon	Widely recognized UN member state. EEC member (from 1 January 1986). Portugal had two autonomous regions: the Azores and Madeira. Portugal had one Chinese territory which it administered as a dependency: Macau; Portugal claimed sovereignty over the former colony of Portuguese Timor, which had been annexed by Indonesia. It also claimed the Spanish municipalities of Olivenza and Táliga.
=== Q ===
Qatar – State of Qatar; Capital: Doha	Widely recognized UN member state.
=== R ===
→ Romania; Capital: Bucharest: Socialist Republic of Romania (to 28 December 1989); Romania (from 28 December 1989)	Widely recognized UN member state.
Rwanda – Rwandese Republic (Note: Rwanda's official French name was "République rwandaise". It could be translated into English as "Rwandese Republic"., "Rwandan Republic", or "Republic of Rwanda".); Capital: Kigali	Widely recognized UN member state.
=== S ===
→ Saint Kitts and Nevis; Capital: Basseterre: Saint Christopher-Nevis-Anguilla (to 19 December 1980); Saint Christopher and Nevis (from 19 December 1980 to 18 September 1983); Federation of Saint Kitts and Nevis (from 19 September 1983) (Note: Saint Kitts and Nevis gained independence from the United Kingdom on 19 September 1983.)	Associated state of the United Kingdom (to 18 September 1983); widely recognized independent state (from 19 September 1983). UN member state (from 23 September 1983); Commonwealth realm. Saint Kitts and Nevis was a federation of fourteen parishes within two islands. (Note: 2 islands: Saint Kitts, Nevis.14 parishes: Christ Church Nichola Town (Saint Kitts), Saint Anne Sandy Point (Saint Kitts), Saint George Basseterre (Saint Kitts), Saint George Gingerland (Nevis), Saint James Windward (Nevis), Saint John Capesterre (Saint Kitts), Saint John Figtree (Nevis), Saint Mary Cayon (Saint Kitts), Saint Paul Capisterre (Saint Kitts), Saint Paul Charlestown (Nevis), Saint Peter Basseterre (Saint Kitts), Saint Thomas Lowland (Nevis), Saint Thomas Middle Island (Saint Kitts), and Trinity Palmetto Point (Saint Kitts).) Nevis (which was one of the islands) had autonomy.
Saint Lucia; Capital: Castries	Widely recognized UN member state; Commonwealth realm.
→ → Saint Vincent and the Grenadines; Capital: Kingstown	Widely recognized independent state. UN member state (from 16 September 1980); Commonwealth realm.
San Marino – Republic of San Marino; Capital: San Marino	Widely recognized independent state.
São Tomé and Príncipe – Democratic Republic of São Tomé and Príncipe; Capital: São Tomé	Widely recognized UN member state.
Saudi Arabia – Kingdom of Saudi Arabia; Capital: Riyadh	Widely recognized UN member state.
Senegal – Republic of Senegal; Capital: Dakar	Widely recognized UN member state.
Seychelles – Republic of Seychelles; Capital: Victoria	Widely recognized UN member state; the Seychelles claimed the British Indian Ocean Territory and the French territories of Tromelin Island and the Glorioso Islands.
Sierra Leone – Republic of Sierra Leone; Capital: Freetown	Widely recognized UN member state.
Singapore – Republic of Singapore; Capital: Singapore	Widely recognized UN member state.
Solomon Islands; Capital: Honiara	Widely recognized UN member state; Commonwealth realm.
Somalia – Somali Democratic Republic; Capital: Mogadishu	Widely recognized UN member state.
→ South Africa – Republic of South Africa; Capital: Pretoria (administrative), Cape Town (legislative), Bloemfontein (judicial)	Widely recognized UN member state. South Africa had seven autonomous bantustans: Ciskei (to 4 December 1981), Gazankulu, KaNgwane (from 31 August 1984), KwaNdebele (from 1 April 1981), KwaZulu, Lebowa, and QwaQwa.: Ciskei (to 4 December 1981); Gazankulu; KaNgwane (from 31 August 1984); KwaNdebele (from 1 April 1984); → KwaZulu; Lebowa; QwaQwa; There were four bantustans which were nominally independent: Bophuthatswana; Ciskei (from 4 December 1981); Transkei; Venda; South Africa administered one League of Nations mandate: South-West Africa
Soviet Union – Union of Soviet Socialist Republics; Capital: Moscow	Widely recognized UN member state. The Soviet Union was a federation of 15 republics, two of which (Byelorussia and Ukraine) were UN members in their own right. (Note: 15 republics: Armenia, Azerbaijan, Byelorussia, Estonia, Georgia, Kazakhstan, Kirghizia, Latvia, Lithuania, Moldavia, Russian SFSR, Tajikistan, Turkmenistan, Ukraine, Uzbekistan.)
→ Spain; Capital: Madrid: Transitional Spanish Kingdom (to October 28, 1982); Kingdom of Spain (from October 28, 1982)	Widely recognized UN member state; EEC member (from 1 January 1986). Spain consisted of seventeen autonomous communities. Its sovereignty over Ceuta, Isla de Alborán, Isla Perejil, Islas Chafarinas, Melilla and Peñón de Alhucemas was disputed by Morocco. Its sovereignty over Olivenza and Táliga was disputed by Portugal. It claimed the British overseas territory of Gibraltar.
Sri Lanka – Democratic Socialist Republic of Sri Lanka; Capital: Sri Jayawardenapura-Kotte	Widely recognized UN member state.
Sudan; Capital: Khartoum: Democratic Republic of the Sudan (to 10 October 1985) (Note: The constitution of the Democratic Republic of Sudan was suspended on 6 April 1985. An interim constitution was adopted on 10 October 1985, renaming the country to "Republic of the Sudan".); Republic of the Sudan (from 10 October 1985)	Widely recognized UN member state.
Suriname – Republic of Suriname; Capital: Paramaribo	Widely recognized UN member state.
Swaziland – Kingdom of Swaziland; Capital: Mbabane (administrative), Lobamba (royal and legislative)	Widely recognized UN member state.
Sweden – Kingdom of Sweden; Capital: Stockholm	Widely recognized UN member state.
Switzerland – Swiss Confederation; Capital: Bern	Widely recognized independent state; permanent observer at the UN. Switzerland was a federation of 26 cantons. (Note: 26 cantons: Aargau, Appenzell Ausserrhoden, Appenzell Innerrhoden, Basel-Stadt, Basel-Landschaft, Bern, Fribourg, Geneva, Glarus, Graubünden, Jura, Lucerne, Neuchâtel, Nidwalden, Obwalden, Schaffhausen, Schwyz, Solothurn, St. Gallen, Thurgau, Ticino, Uri, Valais, Vaud, Zug, and Zürich.)
→ Syria – Syrian Arab Republic; Capital: Damascus	Widely recognized UN member state. Syria included the Golan Heights, which were occupied by Israel. It disputed the Turkish sovereignty over Hatay Province.
=== T ===
Tanzania – United Republic of Tanzania; Capital: Dar es Salaam	Widely recognized UN member state. Tanzania had one autonomous region: Zanzibar.
Thailand – Kingdom of Thailand; Capital: Bangkok	Widely recognized UN member state.
Togo – Togolese Republic; Capital: Lomé	Widely recognized UN member state.
Tonga – Kingdom of Tonga; Capital: Nukuʻalofa	Widely recognized independent state.
Trinidad and Tobago – Republic of Trinidad and Tobago; Capital: Port of Spain	Widely recognized UN member state. Trinidad and Tobago had one autonomous island: Tobago (from 23 September 1980).
Tunisia – Tunisian Republic; Capital: Tunis	Widely recognized UN member state.
Turkey – Republic of Turkey; Capital: Ankara	Widely recognized UN member state.
Tuvalu; Capital: Funafuti	Widely recognized independent state; Commonwealth realm.
=== U ===
Uganda; Capital: Kampala: Third Republic of Uganda (to 26 January 1986); Fourth Republic of Uganda (from 26 January 1986)	Widely recognized UN member state.
United Arab Emirates; Capital: Abu Dhabi	Widely recognized UN member state; the United Arab Emirates was a federation of seven emirates. (Note: 7 emirates: Abu Dhabi, Ajman, Dubai, Fujairah, Ras al-Khaimah, Sharjah, and Umm al-Qaiwain.)
United Kingdom – United Kingdom of Great Britain and Northern Ireland; Capital: London	Widely recognized UN member state. Commonwealth realm and EEC member. The United Kingdom was composed of four countries: England, Northern Ireland, Scotland, and Wales. The United Kingdom had responsibilities for the following self-governing free associated states: Antigua (to 31 October 1981), with two dependencies; Barbuda; Redonda; Saint Christopher and Nevis (from 19 December 1980 to 18 September 1983); Saint Christopher-Nevis-Anguilla (to 19 December 1980); The United Kingdom administered the foreign affairs of the following protected states: Brunei (to 31 December 1983); New Hebrides (to 29 July 1980, jointly with France); It also had sovereignty over the following crown colonies (dependent territories after 1 January 1983): Anguilla (from 19 December 1980); Belize (to 20 September 1981); Bermuda; British Antarctic Territory (suspended under the Antarctic Treaty); British Indian Ocean Territory (disputed by Mauritius and the Seychelles); British Virgin Islands; Cayman Islands; Falkland Islands (disputed by Argentina), with one dependency; Falkland Islands Dependencies (to 3 October 1985); → Gibraltar; Hong Kong; Montserrat; Pitcairn Islands; → Saint Helena, with two dependencies; Ascension Island; Tristan da Cunha; South Georgia and the South Sandwich Islands (from 3 October 1985, disputed by Argentina); Southern Rhodesia (to 17 April 1980); Sovereign Base Areas of Akrotiri and Dhekelia; Turks and Caicos Islands; In addition, the British Monarch had direct sovereignty over three self-governing Crown dependencies: → Guernsey, with three dependencies: Alderney; Sark; Herm; Isle of Man; → Jersey
United States – United States of America; Capital: Washington, D.C.	Widely recognized UN member state; the United States was a federation of 50 states, one federal district, and one incorporated territory. (Note: 50 states: Alabama, Alaska, Arizona, Arkansas, California, Colorado, Connecticut, Delaware, Florida, Georgia, Hawaii, Idaho, Illinois, Indiana, Iowa, Kansas, Kentucky, Louisiana, Maine, Maryland, Massachusetts, Michigan, Minnesota, Mississippi, Missouri, Montana, Nebraska, Nevada, New Hampshire, New Jersey, New Mexico, New York, North Carolina, North Dakota, Ohio, Oklahoma, Oregon, Pennsylvania, Rhode Island, South Carolina, South Dakota, Tennessee, Texas, Utah, Vermont, Virginia, Washington, West Virginia, Wisconsin, and Wyoming. 1 federal district: District of Columbia. 1 incorporated territory: Palmyra Atoll.) It asserted sovereignty over the following inhabited insular areas: American Samoa (including Swains Island, disputed by Tokelau); Guam; → Northern Mariana Islands (from 4 November 1986); Puerto Rico; United States Virgin Islands; In addition, the United States administered one United Nations Trust Territory: Trust Territory of the Pacific Islands, consisting of four territories: Marshall Islands (to 20 October 1986); Federated States of Micronesia (to 2 November 1986); Northern Mariana Islands (to 3 November 1986); Palau (from 1 January 1981); The United States ceded Roncador Bank and Serrana Bank to Colombia and abandoned its claim to Quita Sueño Bank on 17 September 1981, but it did not explicitly renounce its claims to Serranilla Bank or Bajo Nuevo Bank. According to some government sources, these islands are still considered to be unincorporated territories of the United States.
→ Upper Volta / Burkina Faso; Capital: Ouagadougou: Republic of Upper Volta (to 4 August 1984) (Note: President Thomas Sankara of Upper Volta renamed his country Burkina Faso on 4 August 1984.); Burkina Faso (from 4 August 1984 to 15 October 1987); Burkina Faso (from 15 October 1987)	Widely recognized UN member state.
Uruguay; Capital: Montevideo: Civic-military dictatorship (to 1 March 1985); Eastern Republic of Uruguay (from 1 March 1985)	Widely recognized UN member state.
=== V ===
Vanuatu – Republic of Vanuatu (from 30 July 1980) (Note: Vanuatu became independent from an Anglo-French condominium on 30 July 1980.); Capital: Port Vila	Widely recognized independent state; UN member state (from 15 September 1981).
Vatican City – Vatican City State; Capital: Vatican City	Widely recognized independent state. Vatican City was administered by the Holy See, a sovereign entity recognized by a large number of countries and a Permanent observer at the United Nations. The Holy See also administered a number of extraterritorial properties in Italy. The Pope was the ex officio head of state of Vatican City.
Venezuela – Republic of Venezuela; Capital: Caracas	Widely recognized UN member state. Venezuela was a federation of 20 states, two territories, one federal dependency, and one federal district. (Note: 20 states: Anzoátegui, Apure, Aragua, Barinas, Bolívar, Carabobo, Cojedes, Falcón, Guárico, Lara, Mérida, Miranda, Monagas, Nueva Esparta, Portuguesa, Sucre, Táchira, Trujillo, Yaracuy, Zulia. 2 territories: Amazonas, and Delta Amacuro. 1 federal district: Federal District. 1 federal dependency: Federal Dependencies.)
Vietnam – Socialist Republic of Vietnam; Capital: Hanoi	Widely recognized UN member state. Vietnam claimed sovereignty over the Paracel Islands (disputed by the People's Republic of China and the Republic of China) and Spratly Islands (disputed by the People's Republic of China, the Republic of China, Brunei, the Philippines, and Malaysia).
=== W ===
Western Samoa – Independent State of Western Samoa; Capital: Apia	Widely recognized UN member state.
=== Y ===
Yemen, North – Yemen Arab Republic; Capital: Sana'a	Widely recognized UN member state.
Yemen, South – People's Democratic Republic of Yemen; Capital: Aden	Widely recognized UN member state.
Yugoslavia – Socialist Federal Republic of Yugoslavia; Capital: Belgrade	Widely recognized UN member state; Yugoslavia was a federation of six republics. (Note: 6 republics: Bosnia and Herzegovina, Croatia, Macedonia, Montenegro, Serbia, Slovenia.)
=== Z ===
Zaire – Republic of Zaire; Capital: Kinshasa	Widely recognized UN member state.
Zambia – Republic of Zambia; Capital: Lusaka	Widely recognized UN member state.
Zimbabwe – Republic of Zimbabwe (from 18 April 1980) (Note: Zimbabwe attained its independence from the United Kingdom on 18 April 1980.); Capital: Salisbury (renamed Harare in 1982)	Widely recognized independent state; UN member state (from 25 August 1980).
== States with limited sovereignty, recognition or independence ==
Bophuthatswana – Republic of Bophuthatswana; Capital: Mmabatho	Nominally independent South African bantustan. (Note: The nominally "independent" bantustans of Bophuthatswana, Ciskei, Transkei, and Venda were only recognized by South Africa and by each other. The rest of the world regarded them as part of South Africa.)
Ciskei – Republic of Ciskei (from 4 December 1981) (Note: Ciskei was proclaimed to be "independent" on 4 December 1981.); Capital: Bisho	Nominally independent South African bantustan.
China, Republic of Capital: Taipei (seat of government), Nanjing (claimed)	Partially recognized de facto independent state but de jure widely recognized UN member state. The Republic of China claimed to be the sole legitimate government of China, but only administered Taiwan, Kinmen, the Matsu Islands, Pratas Island and Itu Aba. The Republic of China had territorial claims over Mongolia; the Tuvan Autonomous Soviet Socialist Republic; the Sixty-Four Villages East of the River (administered by the Soviet Union); The majority of Gorno-Badakhshan (administered by the Soviet Union); The eastern tip of the Wakhan Corridor (administered by Afghanistan); a small portion of Gilgit-Baltistan (administered by Pakistan and part of the disputed Kashmir region); Aksai Chin (administered by the People's Republic of China and part of the disputed Kashmir region); eastern Bhutan; South Tibet (controlled by India); and Kachin State (administered by Myanmar).
Cook Islands; Capital: Avarua	A state in free association with New Zealand. It shared a head of state with New Zealand as well as having shared citizenship.
Fizi – Maquis of Fizi (to 1 July 1986); Capital: Fizi	Unrecognized breakaway state in Zaire. Claimed by Zaire.
→ Kampuchea, People's Republic of / Cambodia, State of Capital: Phnom Penh: People's Republic of Kampuchea (to 1 May 1989) (Note: The People's Republic of Kampuchea renamed itself to State of Cambodia on 1 May 1989.); State of Cambodia (from 1 May 1989)	Partially recognized de facto independent state. Claimed to be the sole legitimate government of Kampuchea. The People's Republic of Kampuchea was occupied by Vietnam until 25 September 1989.
Niue; Capital: Alofi	A state in free association with New Zealand. Niue is a member of multiple UN agencies with full treaty making capacity. It had shared citizenship with New Zealand.
Northern Cyprus – Turkish Republic of Northern Cyprus (from 15 November 1983) (Note: The Turkish Federated State of Cyprus declared independence from Cyprus as the Turkish Republic of Northern Cyprus on 15 November 1983.); Capital: Lefkoşa	Partially recognized de facto independent state. (Note: Northern Cyprus was recognized only by Turkey.) Claimed by the Republic of Cyprus.
Palestine – State of Palestine (from 15 November 1988) (Note: The State of Palestine was declared on 15 November 1988.) (Note: The state was recognized by over 90 states by the end of 1989. See: United Nations Educational; Scientific and Cultural Organization; Executive Board (12 May 1989). "Hundred and thirty-first Session: Item 9.4 of the provisional agenda, Request for the Admission of the State of Palestine to UNESCO as a Member State" (PDF). United Nations. pp. 18, Annex II. The list contains 92 entries, including a number of states which no longer exist.) (Note: See the following on statehood criteria: Mendes, Errol (30 March 2010), Statehood and Palestine for the purposes of Article 12 (3) of the ICC Statute (PDF), 30 March 2010, pp. 28, 33: "...the Palestinian State also meets the traditional criteria under the Montevideo Convention..."; "...the fact that a majority of states have recognized Palestine as a State should easily fulfill the requisite state practice".; McKinney, Kathryn M. (1994), "The Legal Effects of the Israeli-PLO Declaration ofPrinciples: Steps Toward Statehood for Palestine", Seattle University Law Review, 18 (93), Seattle University: 97, archived from the original on 2011-07-22: "It is possible, however, to argue for Palestinian statehood based on the constitutive theory".; McDonald, Avril (Spring 2009), "Operation Cast Lead: Drawing the Battle Lines of the Legal Dispute", Human Rights Brief, 25, Washington College of Law, Center for Human Rights and Humanitarian Law: "Whether one applies the criteria of statehood set out in the Montevideo Convention or the more widely accepted constitutive theory of statehood, Palestine might be considered a state.") (non-sovereign, non-UN member nation); Capital: Ramallah (administrative), Gaza City (administrative), Jerusalem (claimed)	Disputed region consisting of two occupied territories: the Gaza Strip and the West Bank, including East Jerusalem. The declared State of Palestine, which claimed independence for all the Palestinian territories from 15 November 1988, was recognized by a large number of countries. In foreign relations, Palestine was represented by the Palestine Liberation Organization, which was a permanent observer at the United Nations.
Rwenzururu – Kingdom of Rwenzururu (to 15 August 1982) (Note: Rwenzururu willingly renounced its independence on 15 August 1982.); Capital: Kasese	De facto independent state. Not recognized by any other state. Claimed by Uganda.
Sahrawi Arab Democratic Republic; Capital: Bir Lehlou (official), Rabouni (seat of government-in-exile), El Aaiún (claimed)	Partially recognized de facto independent state. The Sahrawi Arab Democratic Republic claimed the disputed territory of Western Sahara, most of which was under control of Morocco. The territories under its control, the so-called Free Zone, were claimed by Morocco. Its government resided in exile in Tindouf, Algeria.
Tafea – Nation of Tafea (15 February 1980 to 26 May 1980) (Note: The Tafea Nation declared independence from Vanuatu on 15 February 1980. On 26 May 1980, the movement was put down by the colonial authorities.); Capital: Isangel	De facto independent state. Claimed by the Anglo-French New Hebrides Condominium.
Tamil Eelam (from 23 July 1983); Capital: Trincomalee	Unrecognized de facto self-governing entity. Claimed by Sri Lanka.
Transkei – Republic of Transkei; Capital: Umtata	Nominally independent South African bantustan.
Vemerana – Republic of Vemerana (from 27 May 1980 to 24 July 1980) (Note: The Republic of Vemerana declared independence on 27 May 1980.} The Condominium, with the aid of troops from Papua New Guinea authorities seized Luganville on 24 July 1980.); Capital: Luganville	De facto independent state. Not recognized by any other state. (Note: President Jimmy Stevens of Vemerana was backed by the North American-based Phoenix Foundation.) Claimed by the Anglo-French New Hebrides Condominium.
Venda – Republic of Venda; Capital: Thohoyandou	Nominally independent South African bantustan.

== Other entities ==
Excluded from the list above are the following noteworthy entities which either were not fully sovereign or did not claim to be independent:

- Antarctica as a whole had no government and no permanent population. Seven states claimed portions of Antarctica and five of these had reciprocally recognised one another's claims. These claims, which were regulated by the Antarctic Treaty System, were neither recognised nor disputed by any other signatory state.
- East Timor was occupied and administered by Indonesia as Timor Timur, but this was not recognized by the United Nations, which considered it to be Portuguese territory under Indonesian occupation.
- Estonia was effectively a part of the Soviet Union, but the legality of the annexation was not widely recognized. The Baltic diplomatic services in the West continued to be recognised as representing the de jure state.
- The Federal Republic of Mindanao was a short-lived, self-proclaimed, unrecognized breakaway state encompassing Mindanao, Palawan and the Sulu Archipelago of the Philippines. The independence of the republic was to be proclaimed at a convention in Cagayan de Oro on April 25, 1986 by the Mindanao People's Democratic Movement led by Reuben Canoy but original plans to proclaim the proposed republic's independence were changed to avert arrest by the Corazon Aquino administration due to violation against sedition law.
- Latvia was effectively a part of the Soviet Union, but the legality of the annexation was not widely recognized. The Baltic diplomatic services in the West continued to be recognised as representing the de jure state.
- Lithuania was incorporated into the Soviet Union in 1940, but the legality of the annexation was not widely recognized. The Baltic diplomatic services in the West continued to be recognised as representing the de jure state.
- The Saudi Arabian–Iraqi neutral zone was a strip of neutral territory between Iraq and Saudi Arabia (to 26 December 1981).
- The Sovereign Military Order of Malta was an entity claiming sovereignty. The order had bi-lateral diplomatic relations with a large number of states, but had no territory other than extraterritorial areas within Rome. The order's Constitution stated: "The Order is a subject of international law and exercises sovereign functions." Although the order frequently asserted its sovereignty, it did not claim to be a sovereign state. It lacked a defined territory. Since all its members were citizens of other states, almost all of them lived in their native countries, and those who resided in the order's extraterritorial properties in Rome did so only in connection with their official duties, the order lacked the characteristic of having a permanent population.
- West Berlin was a political enclave that was closely aligned with – but not actually a part of – West Germany. It consisted of three occupied sectors administered by the United States, the United Kingdom, and France.

== See also ==
- List of sovereign states
- List of sovereign states by year
- List of state leaders in 1980
- List of state leaders in 1981
- List of state leaders in 1982
- List of state leaders in 1983
- List of state leaders in 1984
- List of state leaders in 1985
- List of state leaders in 1986
- List of state leaders in 1987
- List of state leaders in 1988
- List of state leaders in 1989
