= Ponte da Ajuda =

Bridge of Ajuda Ponte da Ajuda/Puente de Ayuda
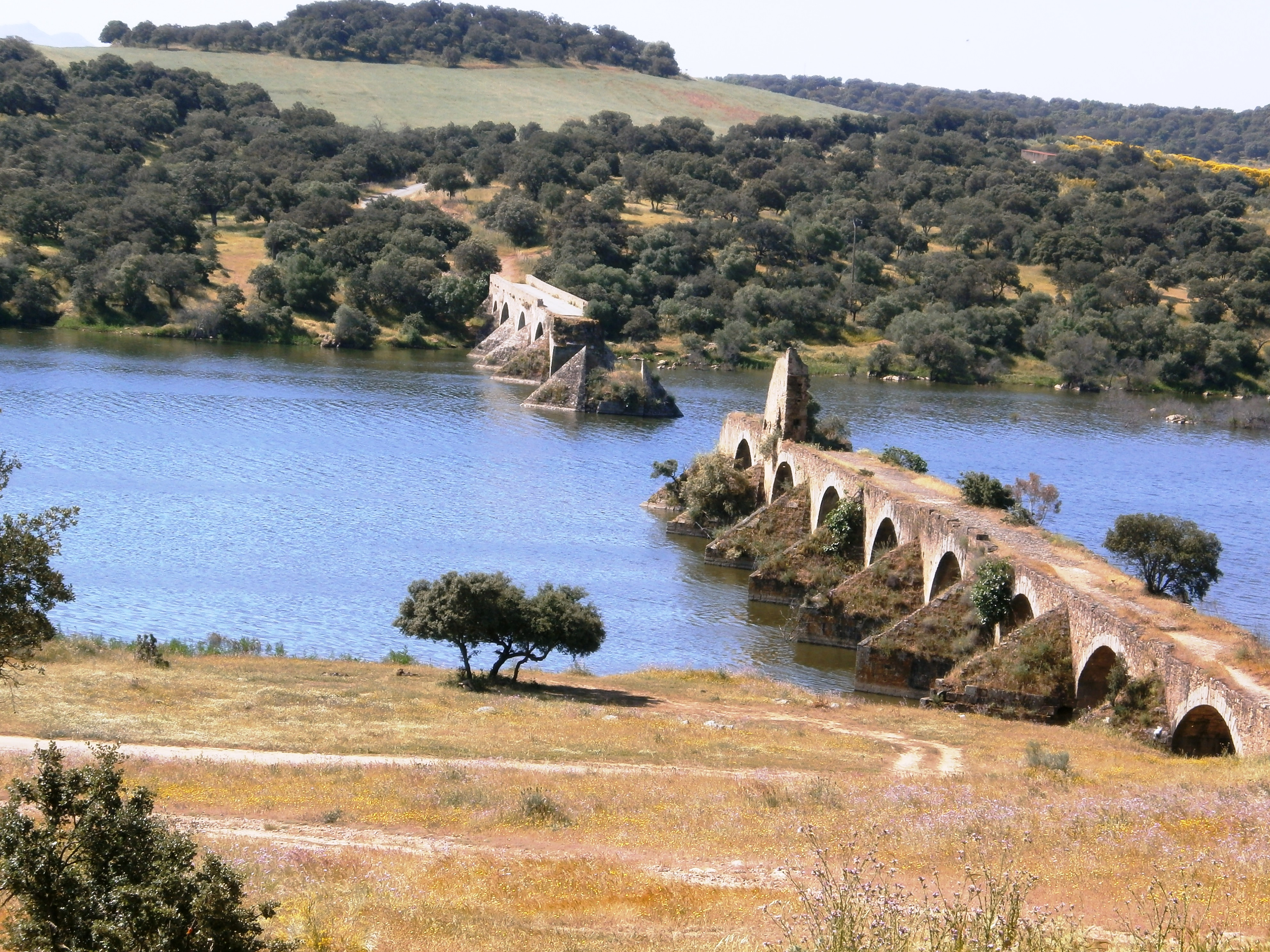
- A view of the ruined bridge over Guadiana River showing banks in Portugal and Spain
- Coordinates: 38.7764°N 7.1706°W
- Carried: Abandoned
- Crossed: Guadiana River
- Locale: Ajuda/Ayuda
- Official name: Ponte de Nossa Senhora da Ajuda; Puente de Nuestra Señora de Ayuda
- Named for: Nossa Senhora da Ajuda/Nuestra Señora de Ayuda
- Owner: Portugal/Spain
- Heritage status: Imóvel de Interesse Público/Bien de Interés Cultural

Characteristics
- Material: Stone
- Total length: 453 m (1,486.2 ft)
- Width: 5 m (16.4 ft)
- Height: 161 m (528.2 ft)
- No. of spans: 1
- Piers in water: 13

History
- Constructed by: Arrudas
- Construction start: 1510; 515 years ago
- Opened: 1521
- Rebuilt: 1640
- Collapsed: 1657
- Closed: 1709

The Bridge of Ajuda (Portuguese: Ponte de Nossa Senhora da Ajuda, Spanish: Puente de Nuestra Señora de Ayuda) is a dilapidated bridge that crosses the Guadiana River between Elvas and Olivenza.

== History ==
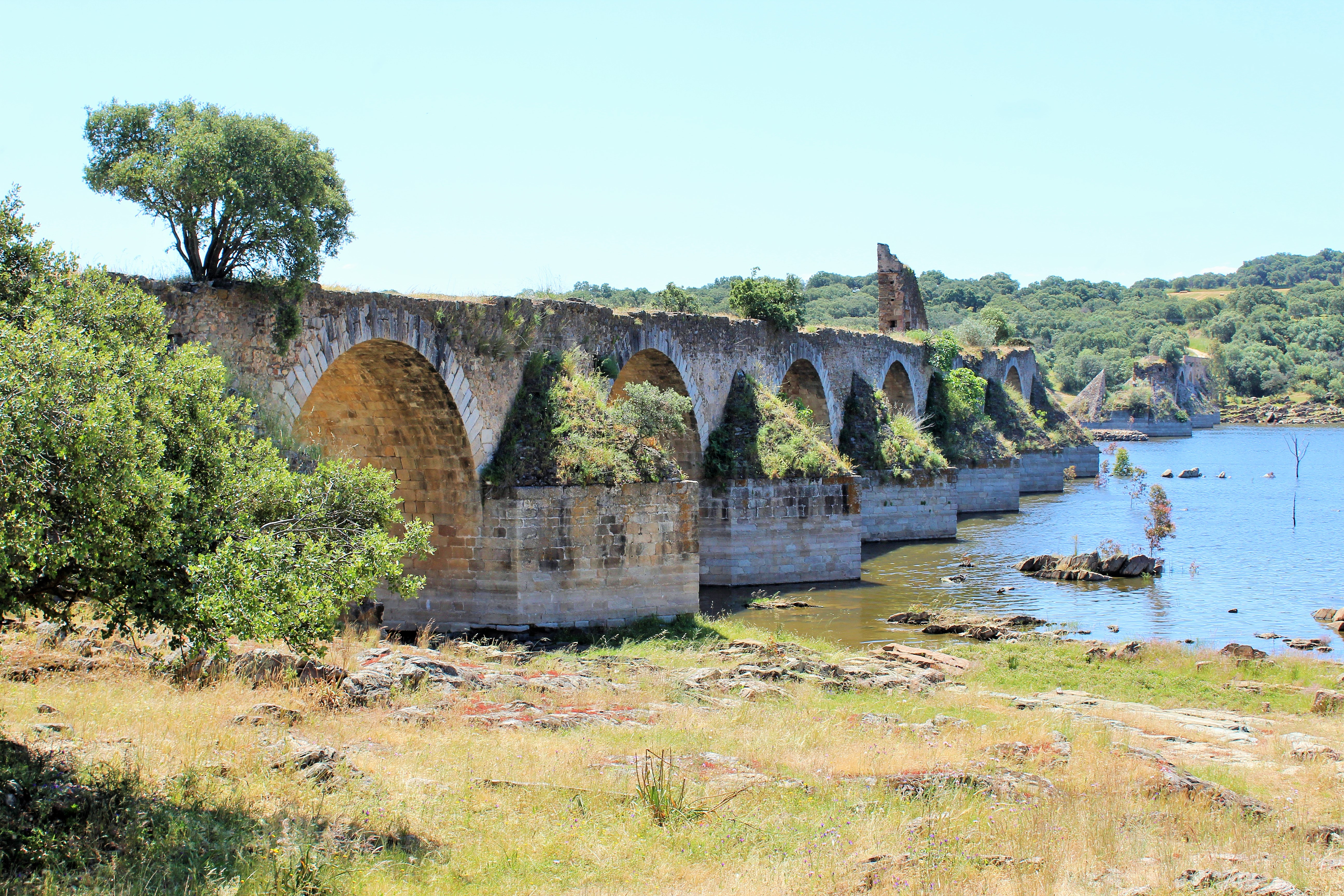
The view of the bridge over the Guadiana

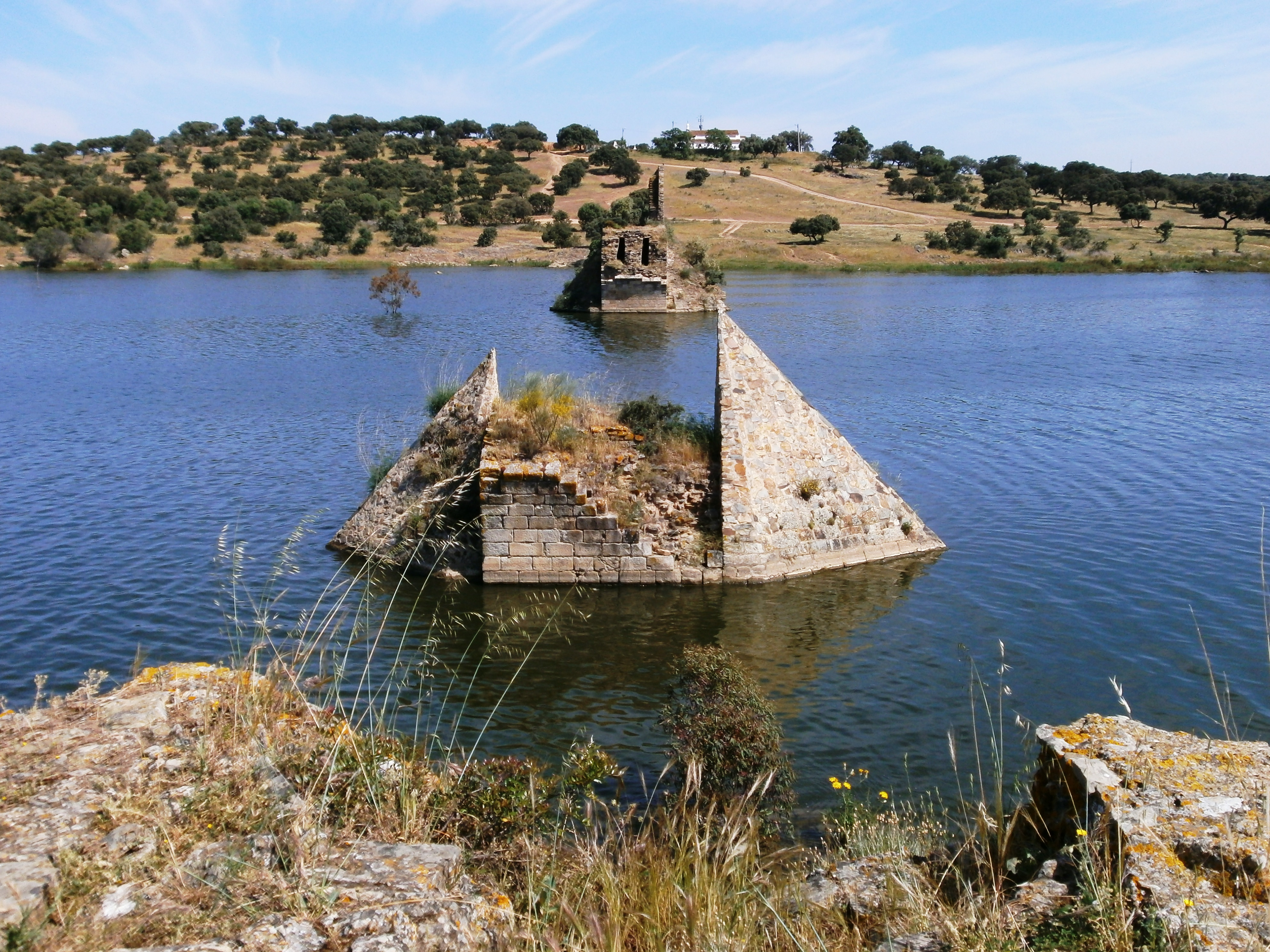
Remains of the remaining large talhamare buttresses from the bridge

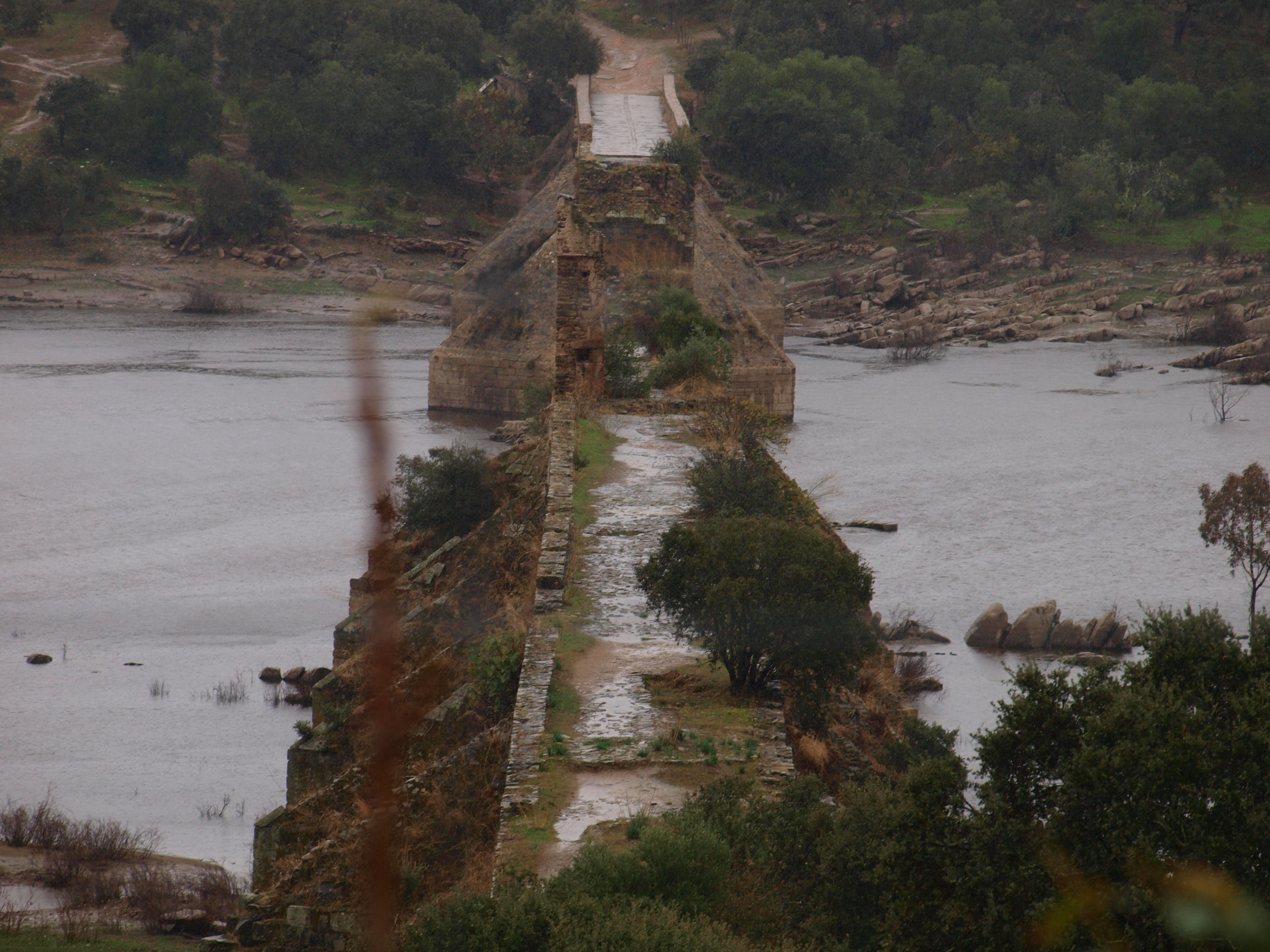
The bridge over the right bank with a view of the ruined tower

The bridge was constructed between 1520 and 1521, during the reign of King D. Manuel I of Portugal from the left bank of the Guadiana, in the parish of Senhora da Ajuda, along a roadway segment between Elvas and Olivença (and attributed to the "Arruda brothers"). During 1597, many of the archways were damaged or destroyed during flooding.

Between 1640 and 1642, Matias de Albuquerque, Governor of the Alentejo, began the refortification of Olivença with the construction of a third or fourth lines of walls. During this period it is possible that the bridge was rebuilt, since it was in a state of ruin at the time of the Governor's visit to Elvas and Olivença. However, it was partially destroyed by Spanish forces in 1657. It was then rebuilt in the same century.

In 1705, redoubts were constructed to reinforce the bridge over the Guadiana, designed by Manuel da Maia. In 1709 the bridge was partially demolished by artillery during the War of the Spanish Succession.

The Spanish army, under the command of D. Manuel Godoy annexed the town of Olivença in 1801.

In 1903, in Vila Viçosa, King D. Carlos proposed the reconstruction of the bridge.

On 24 January 1967 the Portuguese government declared the bridge a Imóvel de Interesse Público (Property of Public Interest). This was complimented, on 13 March 2009, when the Spanish government declared the bridge as a Bien de Interés Cultural (Possession of Cultural Interest).

== Architecture ==
The bridge is located in a rural environment, isolated and encircled by wild vegetation, approximately 100 metres (330 ft) from the Chapel of Nossa Senhora da Ajuda, along a segment of abandoned road 12 kilometres (7.5 mi) between Elvas and Olivenza. Although in ruin, the bridge was 453 metres (1,486 ft) long and 5 metres (16 ft) wide, with a platform that was at most 161 metres (528 ft) above the river.

Eight arches remain along the right margin and 5 along the left margin, consisting of inconsistent rounded arches supported by talhamares. The archivolts, with two rows of staves, are supported by quadrangular pillars reinforced by high talhamares. Along the main platform, an old tower was erected along the sixth arch of the right bank, which was constructed over large boulders, now visible along the margin.

== See also ==
- Guadiana International Bridge
- Lower Guadiana International bridge
