= San Jorge de Alor =

San Jorge de Alor / São Jorge da Lor
- Municipality
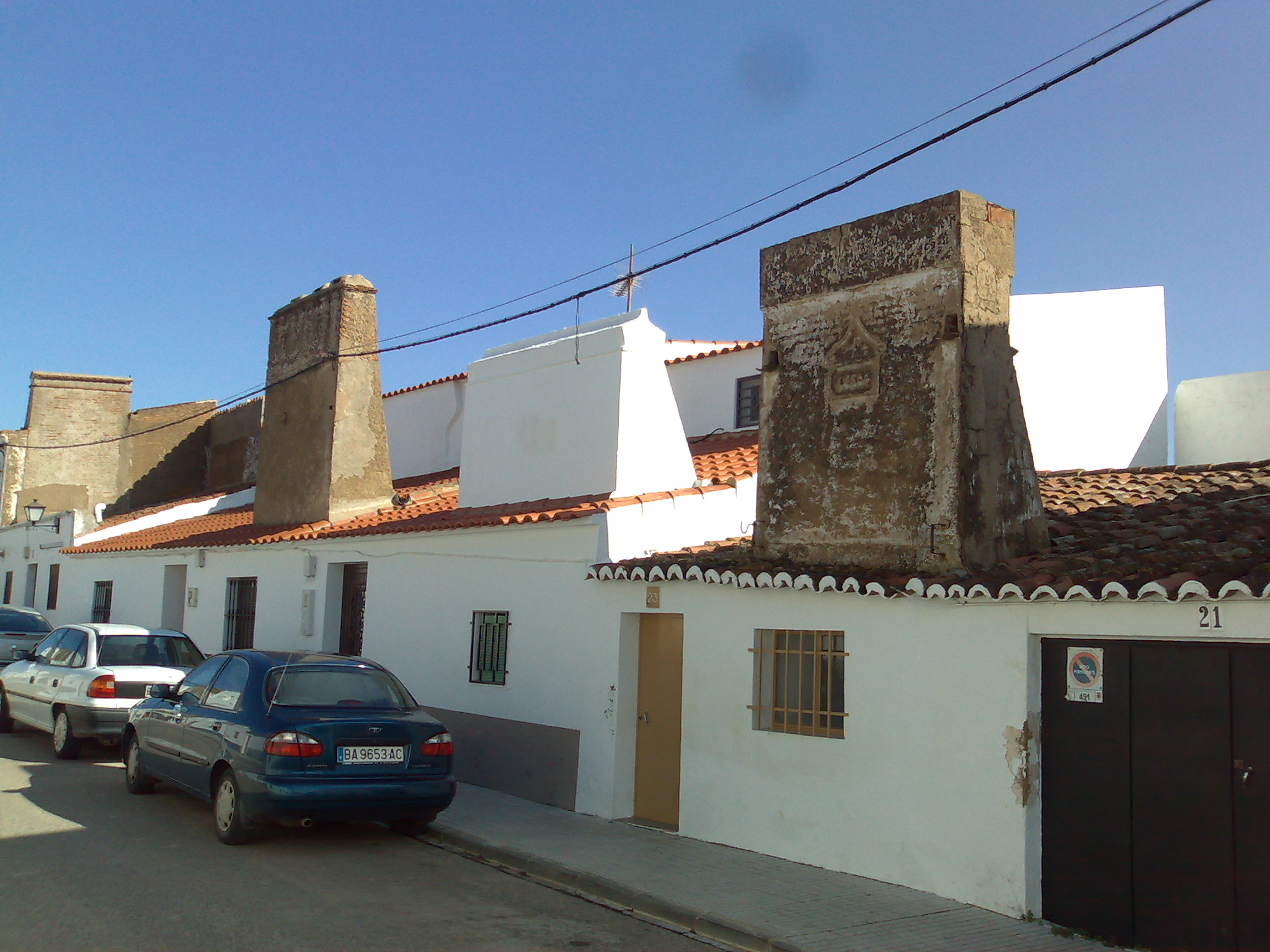
- Interactive map of San Jorge de Alor / São Jorge da Lor
- Coordinates: 38°38′43.6″N 7°03′23.6″W
- Country: Disputed: Spain; Portugal
- Status within Spain: Extremadura
- Status within Portugal: Alto Alentejo Province

Population (2013)
  - Total: 508

San Jorge de Alor (Portuguese: São Jorge da Lor) is a village located on the disputed section of the Portugal–Spain border, near Olivenza.
