= Táliga =

Táliga Talega
- Municipality
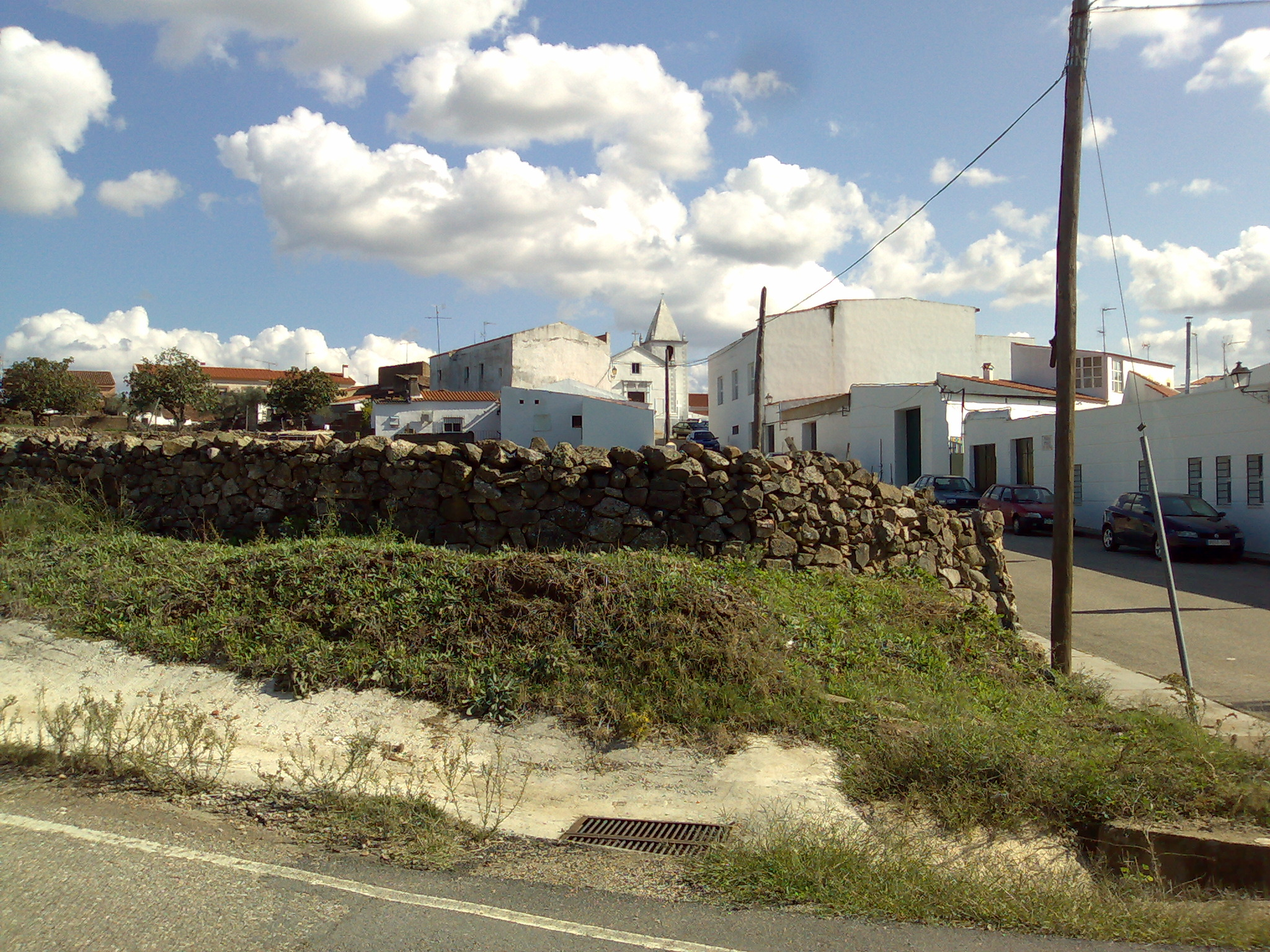

- Flag Coat of arms

- Location in Spain/Portugal Táliga (Spain)
- Coordinates: 38°31′N 7°0′W
- Country: Spain
- Spanish community: Extremadura
- Spanish Province: Badajoz

Government
  - Alcalde: Inmaculada Bonilla Martínez (2007) (PSOE)

Area
  - Total: 31 km^{2} (12 sq mi)
- Elevation: 315 m (1,033 ft)

Population (2025-01-01)
  - Total: 650
  - Density: 21/km^{2} (54/sq mi)
- Demonym: Taligueño/ña
- Time zone: UTC+1 (CET)
  - Summer (DST): UTC+2 (CEST)
- Postal code: 06133
- Official language(s): Spanish
- Website: Official website

Táliga (Spanish: [ˈtaliɣa]) or Talega (Portuguese: [tɐˈlɛɣɐ]) is a Spanish town and municipality located near the border with Portugal, in the province of Badajoz, in the Spanish autonomous community of Extremadura. Some Portuguese consider Táliga, as well as neighbouring Olivenza, a de jure part of the Portuguese concelho of Olivenza, occupied by Spain since 1801.

Under Portuguese administration, Talega was a freguesia (parish) of the concelho (municipality) of Olivenza. It became an independent municipality in 1850, already under Spanish administration.

== History ==
In 1801, in the framework of the Napoleonic Wars, Spain invaded Portugal during the War of the Oranges. Under the Treaty of Badajoz, Portugal was forced to cede the territories of Olivença and Talega in exchange for Spain maintaining peace with Portugal.

In 1807, Spain and France entered into a secret agreement to divide Portugal into three parts. This agreement culminated in the invasion of Portugal by the French army—supported by Spain—in violation of the Treaty of Badajoz.

In 1817, Spain signed the Treaty of Vienna, agreeing to return the territories annexed during the War of the Oranges. Spain never returned the territories.

== See also ==
- List of municipalities in Badajoz
