= 2003 Spanish local elections in Catalonia =

This article presents the results breakdown of the local elections held in Catalonia on 25 May 2003. The following tables show detailed results in the autonomous community's most populous municipalities, sorted alphabetically.

== City control ==
The following table lists party control in the most populous municipalities, including provincial capitals (highlighted in bold). Gains for a party are highlighted in that party's colour.

Municipality	Population	Previous control	New control
Badalona	210,370	Socialists' Party of Catalonia (PSC–PSOE)	Socialists' Party of Catalonia (PSC–PSOE)
**Barcelona**	1,527,190	Socialists' Party of Catalonia (PSC–PSOE)	Socialists' Party of Catalonia (PSC–PSOE)
Cornellà de Llobregat	81,881	Socialists' Party of Catalonia (PSC–PSOE)	Socialists' Party of Catalonia (PSC–PSOE)
**Girona**	77,475	Socialists' Party of Catalonia (PSC–PSOE)	Socialists' Party of Catalonia (PSC–PSOE)
L'Hospitalet de Llobregat	244,323	Socialists' Party of Catalonia (PSC–PSOE)	Socialists' Party of Catalonia (PSC–PSOE)
**Lleida**	115,000	Socialists' Party of Catalonia (PSC–PSOE)	Socialists' Party of Catalonia (PSC–PSOE)
Mataró	109,298	Socialists' Party of Catalonia (PSC–PSOE)	Socialists' Party of Catalonia (PSC–PSOE)
Reus	91,616	Socialists' Party of Catalonia (PSC–PSOE)	Socialists' Party of Catalonia (PSC–PSOE)
Sabadell	187,201	Socialists' Party of Catalonia (PSC–PSOE)	Socialists' Party of Catalonia (PSC–PSOE)
Sant Boi de Llobregat	80,041	Socialists' Party of Catalonia (PSC–PSOE)	Socialists' Party of Catalonia (PSC–PSOE)
Sant Cugat del Vallès	59,837	Convergence and Union (CiU)	Convergence and Union (CiU)
Santa Coloma de Gramenet	115,568	Socialists' Party of Catalonia (PSC–PSOE)	Socialists' Party of Catalonia (PSC–PSOE)
**Tarragona**	117,184	Convergence and Union (CiU)	Convergence and Union (CiU)
Terrassa	179,300	Socialists' Party of Catalonia (PSC–PSOE)	Socialists' Party of Catalonia (PSC–PSOE)

== Municipalities ==
=== Badalona ===
Population: 210,370

← Summary of the 25 May 2003 City Council of Badalona election results →
Parties and alliances	Popular vote			Seats	
Parties and alliances	Votes	%	±pp	Total	+/−
Socialists' Party of Catalonia–Municipal Progress (PSC–PM)	35,757	40.07	−0.91	12	−1
People's Party (PP)	15,637	17.52	+2.23	5	±0
Initiative–Alternative Left–Agreement for Municipal Progress (ICV–EA–EPM)^{1}	14,669	16.44	+0.10	5	+1
Convergence and Union (CiU)	11,716	13.13	−2.27	3	−2
Republican Left of Catalonia–Municipal Agreement (ERC–AM)	6,877	7.71	+3.19	2	+2
The Greens and More (ViM)	1,773	1.99	New	0	±0
Independent Space Place (LLEI)	699	0.78	+0.25	0	±0
European Democratic Centre (CDE)	426	0.48	New	0	±0
Federation of Independent Municipalists of Catalonia (FIMCAT)	207	0.23	New	0	±0
Humanist Party of Catalonia (PHC)	138	0.15	+0.05	0	±0
Blank ballots	1,345	1.51	−0.28		
Total	89,244			27	±0
Valid votes	89,244	99.67	+0.20		
Invalid votes	294	0.33	−0.20		
Votes cast / turnout	89,538	52.35	+5.20		
Abstentions	81,489	47.65	−5.20		
Registered voters	171,027				
Sources
Footnotes: ^{1} Initiative–Alternative Left–Agreement for Municipal Progress results are compared to the combined totals of Initiative for Catalonia–Greens–Agreement for Municipal Progress and United and Alternative Left in the 1999 election.

=== Barcelona ===
Population: 1,527,190

=== Cornellà de Llobregat ===
Population: 81,881

← Summary of the 25 May 2003 City Council of Cornellà de Llobregat election results →
Parties and alliances	Popular vote			Seats	
Parties and alliances	Votes	%	±pp	Total	+/−
Socialists' Party of Catalonia–Municipal Progress (PSC–PM)	19,817	52.59	−3.31	14	−2
Initiative–Alternative Left–Agreement for Municipal Progress (ICV–EA–EPM)^{1}	6,005	15.94	−1.40	4	±0
People's Party (PP)	5,163	13.70	+1.22	3	±0
Republican Left of Catalonia–Municipal Agreement (ERC–AM)	3,485	9.25	+3.36	2	+1
Convergence and Union (CiU)	2,678	7.11	+0.21	2	+1
Blank ballots	532	1.41	−0.07		
Total	37,680			25	±0
Valid votes	37,680	99.64	+0.17		
Invalid votes	138	0.36	−0.17		
Votes cast / turnout	37,818	58.57	+7.72		
Abstentions	26,748	41.43	−7.72		
Registered voters	64,566				
Sources
Footnotes: ^{1} Initiative–Alternative Left–Agreement for Municipal Progress results are compared to the combined totals of Initiative for Catalonia–Greens–Agreement for Municipal Progress and United and Alternative Left in the 1999 election.

=== Girona ===
Population: 77,475

← Summary of the 25 May 2003 City Council of Girona election results →
Parties and alliances	Popular vote			Seats	
Parties and alliances	Votes	%	±pp	Total	+/−
Socialists' Party of Catalonia–Municipal Progress (PSC–PM)	14,599	38.55	−9.30	11	−3
Convergence and Union (CiU)	7,585	20.03	−3.21	5	−1
Republican Left of Catalonia–Municipal Agreement (ERC–AM)	6,596	17.42	+8.16	4	+2
People's Party (PP)	4,000	10.56	+1.17	3	+1
Initiative–Alternative Left–Agreement for Municipal Progress (ICV–EA–EPM)^{1}	3,893	10.28	+3.20	2	+1
Popular Unity Candidacy (CUP)	381	1.01	New	0	±0
Internationalist Struggle (LI (LIT–CI))	113	0.30	New	0	±0
Another Democracy is Possible (UADeP)	78	0.21	New	0	±0
Humanist Party of Catalonia (PHC)	60	0.16	−0.06	0	±0
Blank ballots	568	1.50	−0.37		
Total	37,873			25	±0
Valid votes	37,873	99.47	+0.09		
Invalid votes	201	0.53	−0.09		
Votes cast / turnout	38,074	61.33	+3.33		
Abstentions	24,005	38.67	−3.33		
Registered voters	62,079				
Sources
Footnotes: ^{1} Initiative–Alternative Left–Agreement for Municipal Progress results are compared to the combined totals of Initiative for Catalonia–Greens–Agreement for Municipal Progress and United and Alternative Left in the 1999 election.

=== L'Hospitalet de Llobregat ===
Population: 244,323

← Summary of the 25 May 2003 City Council of L'Hospitalet de Llobregat election results →
Parties and alliances	Popular vote			Seats	
Parties and alliances	Votes	%	±pp	Total	+/−
Socialists' Party of Catalonia–Municipal Progress (PSC–PM)	56,896	53.18	−2.59	16	−2
People's Party (PP)	17,003	15.89	+0.58	4	±0
Initiative–Alternative Left–Agreement for Municipal Progress (ICV–EA–EPM)^{1}	12,519	11.70	+0.27	3	+1
Convergence and Union (CiU)	10,466	9.78	−1.45	3	±0
Republican Left of Catalonia–Municipal Agreement (ERC–AM)	5,834	5.45	+3.01	1	+1
The Greens–Eco-pacifists of Catalonia (EV–Eco)	2,392	2.24	New	0	±0
Another Democracy is Possible (UADeP)	305	0.29	New	0	±0
Humanist Party of Catalonia (PHC)	159	0.15	−0.04	0	±0
Blank ballots	1,412	1.32	−0.27		
Total	106,986			27	±0
Valid votes	106,986	99.64	+0.26		
Invalid votes	390	0.36	−0.26		
Votes cast / turnout	107,376	54.81	+6.87		
Abstentions	88,512	45.19	−6.87		
Registered voters	195,888				
Sources
Footnotes: ^{1} Initiative–Alternative Left–Agreement for Municipal Progress results are compared to the combined totals of United and Alternative Left and Initiative for Catalonia–Greens–Agreement for Municipal Progress in the 1999 election.

=== Lleida ===
Population: 115,000

← Summary of the 25 May 2003 City Council of Lleida election results →
Parties and alliances	Popular vote			Seats	
Parties and alliances	Votes	%	±pp	Total	+/−
Socialists' Party of Catalonia–Municipal Progress (PSC–PM)	20,180	36.30	−12.84	10	−4
Convergence and Union (CiU)	13,013	23.41	+3.73	7	+1
People's Party (PP)	7,728	13.90	+0.66	4	±0
ERC–Greens and More–Municipal Agreement (ERC–ViM–AM)	6,982	12.56	+4.91	3	+1
Initiative–Alternative Left–Agreement for Municipal Progress (ICV–EA–EPM)^{1}	5,722	10.29	+3.07	3	+2
Organization of Independent Neighbours (OVI)	931	1.67	New	0	±0
Humanist Party of Catalonia (PHC)	83	0.15	±0.00	0	±0
Group of Independents, Progressives and Nationalists (AIPN)	52	0.09	−0.01	0	±0
Blank ballots	901	1.62	−0.63		
Total	55,592			27	±0
Valid votes	55,592	99.63	+0.19		
Invalid votes	208	0.37	−0.19		
Votes cast / turnout	55,800	59.43	+4.92		
Abstentions	38,095	40.57	−4.92		
Registered voters	93,895				
Sources
Footnotes: ^{1} Initiative–Alternative Left–Agreement for Municipal Progress results are compared to the combined totals of Initiative for Catalonia–Greens–Agreement for Municipal Progress and United and Alternative Left in the 1999 election.

=== Mataró ===
Population: 109,298

← Summary of the 25 May 2003 City Council of Mataró election results →
Parties and alliances	Popular vote			Seats	
Parties and alliances	Votes	%	±pp	Total	+/−
Socialists' Party of Catalonia–Municipal Progress (PSC–PM)	17,029	33.56	−11.63	11	−3
Convergence and Union (CiU)	10,293	20.28	−3.99	6	−1
People's Party (PP)	8,681	17.11	+2.98	5	+1
Initiative–Alternative Left–Agreement for Municipal Progress (ICV–EA–EPM)^{1}	5,899	11.62	+1.39	3	+1
Republican Left of Catalonia–Municipal Agreement (ERC–AM)	4,433	8.74	+4.68	2	+2
Neighbourhood Alternative of Mataró (AVdM)	2,507	4.94	New	0	±0
Popular Unity Candidacy (CUP)	1,170	2.31	New	0	±0
Blank ballots	737	1.45	−0.14		
Total	50,749			27	±0
Valid votes	50,749	99.67	+0.11		
Invalid votes	170	0.33	−0.11		
Votes cast / turnout	50,919	60.72	+3.75		
Abstentions	32,944	39.28	−3.75		
Registered voters	83,863				
Sources
Footnotes: ^{1} Initiative–Alternative Left–Agreement for Municipal Progress results are compared to the combined totals of Initiative for Catalonia–Greens–Agreement for Municipal Progress and United and Alternative Left in the 1999 election.

=== Reus ===
Population: 91,616

← Summary of the 25 May 2003 City Council of Reus election results →
Parties and alliances	Popular vote			Seats	
Parties and alliances	Votes	%	±pp	Total	+/−
Socialists' Party of Catalonia–Municipal Progress (PSC–PM)	15,034	36.16	−0.44	10	±0
Convergence and Union (CiU)	9,223	22.18	−0.64	6	±0
People's Party (PP)	5,739	13.80	+0.12	4	±0
Republican Left of Catalonia–Municipal Agreement (ERC–AM)	4,937	11.87	+1.62	3	±0
Initiative–Alternative Left–Agreement for Municipal Progress (ICV–EA–EPM)^{1}	3,303	7.94	−3.27	2	±0
Reus Independent Coordinator (CORI)	1,348	3.24	New	0	±0
Federation of Independents of Catalonia (FIC)	1,286	3.09	+0.31	0	±0
Blank ballots	712	1.71	−0.31		
Total	41,582			25	±0
Valid votes	41,582	99.60	+0.30		
Invalid votes	166	0.40	−0.30		
Votes cast / turnout	41,748	56.91	+6.03		
Abstentions	31,615	43.09	−6.03		
Registered voters	73,363				
Sources
Footnotes: ^{1} Initiative–Alternative Left–Agreement for Municipal Progress results are compared to the combined totals of Initiative for Catalonia–Greens–Agreement for Municipal Progress and United and Alternative Left in the 1999 election.

=== Sabadell ===
Population: 187,201

← Summary of the 25 May 2003 City Council of Sabadell election results →
Parties and alliances	Popular vote			Seats	
Parties and alliances	Votes	%	±pp	Total	+/−
Socialists' Party of Catalonia–Municipal Progress (PSC–PM)	42,502	48.60	+15.13	15	+5
Convergence and Union (CiU)	11,206	12.81	−3.07	3	−1
Initiative–Alternative Left–Agreement for Municipal Progress (ICV–EA–EPM)	9,399	10.75	−22.60	3	−7
People's Party (PP)	7,930	9.07	−0.67	2	±0
Republican Left of Catalonia–Municipal Agreement (ERC–AM)	7,888	9.02	+3.92	2	+1
Agreement for Sabadell (ES)	6,111	6.99	New	2	+2
Citizen Platform for Sabadell (PCpS)	560	0.64	New	0	±0
Another Democracy is Possible (UADeP)	345	0.39	New	0	±0
Republican Left–Left Republican Party (IR–PRE)	235	0.27	New	0	±0
Republican Social Movement (MSR)	192	0.22	New	0	±0
Blank ballots	1,077	1.23	−0.46		
Total	87,445			27	±0
Valid votes	87,445	99.69	+0.21		
Invalid votes	269	0.31	−0.21		
Votes cast / turnout	87,714	56.88	+5.33		
Abstentions	66,491	43.12	−5.33		
Registered voters	154,205				

=== Sant Boi de Llobregat ===
Population: 80,041

← Summary of the 25 May 2003 City Council of Sant Boi de Llobregat election results →
Parties and alliances	Popular vote			Seats	
Parties and alliances	Votes	%	±pp	Total	+/−
Socialists' Party of Catalonia–Municipal Progress (PSC–PM)	16,307	46.59	−6.94	12	−3
Initiative–Alternative Left–Agreement for Municipal Progress (ICV–EA–EPM)^{1}	7,072	20.20	+0.92	5	+1
People's Party (PP)	5,197	14.85	+3.30	4	+1
Republican Left of Catalonia–Municipal Agreement (ERC–AM)	2,991	8.55	+4.93	2	+2
Convergence and Union (CiU)	2,693	7.69	−2.77	2	−1
European Democratic Centre (CDE)	172	0.49	New	0	±0
Blank ballots	570	1.62	+0.07		
Total	35,002			25	±0
Valid votes	35,002	99.56	+0.26		
Invalid votes	153	0.44	−0.26		
Votes cast / turnout	35,155	54.64	+7.45		
Abstentions	29,182	45.36	−7.45		
Registered voters	64,337				
Sources
Footnotes: ^{1} Initiative–Alternative Left–Agreement for Municipal Progress results are compared to the combined totals of Initiative for Catalonia–Greens–Agreement for Municipal Progress and United and Alternative Left in the 1999 election.

=== Sant Cugat del Vallès ===
Population: 59,837

← Summary of the 25 May 2003 City Council of Sant Cugat del Vallès election results →
Parties and alliances	Popular vote			Seats	
Parties and alliances	Votes	%	±pp	Total	+/−
Convergence and Union (CiU)	11,709	37.25	+5.42	10	+1
Socialists' Party–Citizens for Change–Municipal Progress (PSC–CpC–PM)	6,958	22.13	−6.78	6	−2
Republican Left of Catalonia–Municipal Agreement (ERC–AM)	4,435	14.11	+5.90	3	+1
Initiative–Alternative Left–Agreement for Municipal Progress (ICV–EA–EPM)^{1}	3,796	12.07	−0.31	3	+1
People's Party (PP)	3,560	11.32	−2.67	3	−1
Union of Independents of Sant Cugat (UNIS)	451	1.43	+0.24	0	±0
Another Democracy is Possible (UADeP)	0	0.00	New	0	±0
Blank ballots	528	1.68	−1.01		
Total	31,437			25	±0
Valid votes	31,437	99.59	+0.02		
Invalid votes	130	0.41	−0.02		
Votes cast / turnout	31,567	64.65	+10.21		
Abstentions	17,257	35.35	−10.21		
Registered voters	48,824				
Sources
Footnotes: ^{1} Initiative–Alternative Left–Agreement for Municipal Progress results are compared to the combined totals of Initiative for Catalonia–Greens–Agreement for Municipal Progress and United and Alternative Left in the 1999 election.

=== Santa Coloma de Gramenet ===
Population: 115,568

← Summary of the 25 May 2003 City Council of Santa Coloma de Gramenet election results →
Parties and alliances	Popular vote			Seats	
Parties and alliances	Votes	%	±pp	Total	+/−
Socialists' Party of Catalonia–Municipal Progress (PSC–PM)	25,820	53.79	−4.55	16	−2
Initiative–Alternative Left–Agreement for Municipal Progress (ICV–EA–EPM)^{1}	8,656	18.03	−2.39	5	+1
People's Party (PP)	6,708	13.98	+4.00	4	+1
Convergence and Union (CiU)	3,947	8.22	+0.47	2	±0
People of Santa Coloma–ERC–Municipal Agreement (GSC–ERC–AM)	1,848	3.85	+2.28	0	±0
Another Democracy is Possible (UADeP)	269	0.56	New	0	±0
Blank ballots	752	1.57	−0.14		
Total	48,000			27	±0
Valid votes	48,000	99.73	+0.14		
Invalid votes	132	0.27	−0.14		
Votes cast / turnout	48,132	52.38	+4.10		
Abstentions	43,758	47.62	−4.10		
Registered voters	91,890				
Sources
Footnotes: ^{1} Initiative–Alternative Left–Agreement for Municipal Progress results are compared to the combined totals of Initiative for Catalonia–Greens–Agreement for Municipal Progress and United and Alternative Left and the Greens in the 1999 election.

=== Tarragona ===
Population: 117,184

← Summary of the 25 May 2003 City Council of Tarragona election results →
Parties and alliances	Popular vote			Seats	
Parties and alliances	Votes	%	±pp	Total	+/−
Convergence and Union (CiU)	19,569	33.55	−2.99	10	−1
Socialists' Party of Catalonia–Municipal Progress (PSC–PM)	18,394	31.54	+3.17	9	+1
People's Party (PP)	8,663	14.85	−1.73	4	−1
Republican Left of Catalonia–Municipal Agreement (ERC–AM)	5,165	8.86	+3.76	2	+1
Initiative–The Platform–Agreement for Municipal Progress (ICV–LP–EPM)^{1}	5,107	8.76	−2.28	2	±0
Unitary Left (Esq–Uni)	447	0.77	New	0	±0
Humanist Party of Catalonia (PHC)	112	0.19	−0.02	0	±0
Blank ballots	863	1.48	−0.41		
Total	58,320			27	±0
Valid votes	58,320	99.63	+0.13		
Invalid votes	218	0.37	−0.13		
Votes cast / turnout	58,538	60.51	+4.59		
Abstentions	38,197	39.49	−4.59		
Registered voters	96,735				
Sources
Footnotes: ^{1} Initiative–The Platform–Agreement for Municipal Progress results are compared to the combined totals of Initiative for Catalonia–Greens–Agreement for Municipal Progress and United and Alternative Left in the 1999 election.

=== Terrassa ===
Population: 179,300

← Summary of the 25 May 2003 City Council of Terrassa election results →
Parties and alliances	Popular vote			Seats	
Parties and alliances	Votes	%	±pp	Total	+/−
Socialists' Party of Catalonia–Municipal Progress (PSC–PM)	34,252	43.57	−6.84	13	−3
Convergence and Union (CiU)	14,043	17.86	+0.89	5	±0
Initiative–Alternative Left–Agreement for Municipal Progress (ICV–EA–EPM)^{1}	10,070	12.81	+2.76	3	+1
People's Party (PP)	9,714	12.36	+0.70	3	±0
Republican Left of Catalonia–Municipal Agreement (ERC–AM)	8,543	10.87	+5.21	3	+2
Popular Unity Candidacy (CUP)	418	0.53	New	0	±0
Another Democracy is Possible (UADeP)	241	0.31	New	0	±0
Republican Left–Left Republican Party (IR–PRE)	206	0.26	New	0	±0
Blank ballots	1,122	1.43	−0.48		
Total	78,609			27	±0
Valid votes	78,609	99.67	+0.11		
Invalid votes	259	0.33	−0.11		
Votes cast / turnout	78,868	54.36	+5.18		
Abstentions	66,206	45.64	−5.18		
Registered voters	145,074				
Sources
Footnotes: ^{1} Initiative–Alternative Left–Agreement for Municipal Progress results are compared to the combined totals of Initiative for Catalonia–Greens–Agreement for Municipal Progress and United and Alternative Left in the 1999 election.

== See also ==
- 2003 Catalan regional election
