= 2007 Spanish local elections in Catalonia =

This article presents the results breakdown of the local elections held in Catalonia on 27 May 2007. The following tables show detailed results in the autonomous community's most populous municipalities, sorted alphabetically.

== City control ==
The following table lists party control in the most populous municipalities, including provincial capitals (shown in bold). Gains for a party are displayed with the cell's background shaded in that party's colour.

Municipality	Population	Previous control	New control
Badalona	221,520	Socialists' Party of Catalonia (PSC–PSOE)	Socialists' Party of Catalonia (PSC–PSOE)
**Barcelona**	1,605,602	Socialists' Party of Catalonia (PSC–PSOE)	Socialists' Party of Catalonia (PSC–PSOE)
Cornellà de Llobregat	84,289	Socialists' Party of Catalonia (PSC–PSOE)	Socialists' Party of Catalonia (PSC–PSOE)
**Girona**	89,890	Socialists' Party of Catalonia (PSC–PSOE)	Socialists' Party of Catalonia (PSC–PSOE)
L'Hospitalet de Llobregat	248,150	Socialists' Party of Catalonia (PSC–PSOE)	Socialists' Party of Catalonia (PSC–PSOE)
**Lleida**	125,677	Socialists' Party of Catalonia (PSC–PSOE)	Socialists' Party of Catalonia (PSC–PSOE)
Mataró	118,748	Socialists' Party of Catalonia (PSC–PSOE)	Socialists' Party of Catalonia (PSC–PSOE)
Reus	101,767	Socialists' Party of Catalonia (PSC–PSOE)	Socialists' Party of Catalonia (PSC–PSOE)
Sabadell	200,545	Socialists' Party of Catalonia (PSC–PSOE)	Socialists' Party of Catalonia (PSC–PSOE)
Sant Boi de Llobregat	81,368	Socialists' Party of Catalonia (PSC–PSOE)	Socialists' Party of Catalonia (PSC–PSOE)
Sant Cugat del Vallès	73,774	Convergence and Union (CiU)	Convergence and Union (CiU)
Santa Coloma de Gramenet	119,056	Socialists' Party of Catalonia (PSC–PSOE)	Socialists' Party of Catalonia (PSC–PSOE)
**Tarragona**	131,158	Convergence and Union (CiU)	Socialists' Party of Catalonia (PSC–PSOE)
Terrassa	199,817	Socialists' Party of Catalonia (PSC–PSOE)	Socialists' Party of Catalonia (PSC–PSOE)

== Municipalities ==
=== Badalona ===
Population: 221,520

← Summary of the 27 May 2007 City Council of Badalona election results →
Parties and alliances	Popular vote			Seats	
Parties and alliances	Votes	%	±pp	Total	+/−
Socialists' Party of Catalonia–Municipal Progress (PSC–PM)	21,352	28.81	−11.26	9	−3
People's Party (PP)	16,203	21.86	+4.34	7	+2
Convergence and Union (CiU)	12,199	16.46	+3.33	5	+2
Initiative–EUiA–Agreement for Municipal Progress (ICV–EUiA–EPM)	10,954	14.78	−1.66	5	±0
Republican Left of Catalonia–Municipal Agreement (ERC–AM)	4,276	5.77	−1.94	1	−1
Citizens–Party of the Citizenry (C's)	3,086	4.16	New	0	±0
The Greens–Popular Unity Candidacy (EV–CUP)	1,562	2.11	New	0	±0
Citizens of Badalona (CdB)	1,113	1.50	New	0	±0
Independent Space Place (LLEI)	560	0.76	−0.02	0	±0
Unsubmissive Seats–Alternative of Discontented Democrats (Ei–ADD)	328	0.44	New	0	±0
Humanist Party (PH)	178	0.24	+0.09	0	±0
Blank ballots	2,307	3.11	+1.60		
Total	74,118			27	±0
Valid votes	74,118	99.60	−0.07		
Invalid votes	301	0.40	+0.07		
Votes cast / turnout	74,419	46.02	−6.33		
Abstentions	87,305	53.98	+6.33		
Registered voters	161,724				

=== Barcelona ===
Population: 1,605,602

=== Cornellà de Llobregat ===
Population: 84,289

← Summary of the 27 May 2007 City Council of Cornellà de Llobregat election results →
Parties and alliances	Popular vote			Seats	
Parties and alliances	Votes	%	±pp	Total	+/−
Socialists' Party of Catalonia–Municipal Progress (PSC–PM)	17,382	56.63	+4.04	16	+2
People's Party (PP)	3,742	12.19	−1.51	3	±0
Initiative–EUiA–Agreement for Municipal Progress (ICV–EUiA–EPM)	3,521	11.47	−4.47	3	−1
Convergence and Union (CiU)	2,161	7.04	−0.07	2	±0
Republican Left of Catalonia–Municipal Agreement (ERC–AM)	1,778	5.79	−3.46	1	−1
Citizens–Party of the Citizenry (C's)	1,394	4.54	New	0	±0
Blank ballots	716	2.33	+0.92		
Total	30,694			25	±0
Valid votes	30,694	99.49	−0.15		
Invalid votes	156	0.51	+0.15		
Votes cast / turnout	30,850	50.79	−7.78		
Abstentions	29,885	49.21	+7.78		
Registered voters	60,735				

=== Girona ===
Population: 89,890

← Summary of the 27 May 2007 City Council of Girona election results →
Parties and alliances	Popular vote			Seats	
Parties and alliances	Votes	%	±pp	Total	+/−
Socialists' Party of Catalonia–Municipal Progress (PSC–PM)	11,279	34.80	−3.75	10	−1
Convergence and Union (CiU)	7,111	21.94	+1.91	6	+1
Republican Left of Catalonia–Municipal Agreement (ERC–AM)	4,167	12.86	−4.56	4	±0
Initiative–EUiA–Agreement for Municipal Progress (ICV–EUiA–EPM)	3,511	10.83	+0.55	3	+1
People's Party (PP)	2,892	8.92	−1.64	2	−1
Popular Unity Candidacy (CUP)	916	2.83	+1.82	0	±0
Citizens–Party of the Citizenry (C's)	737	2.27	New	0	±0
Catalan Republican Party (RC)	211	0.65	New	0	±0
Family and Life Party (PFiV)	105	0.32	New	0	±0
Internationalist Struggle (LI (LIT–CI))	73	0.23	−0.07	0	±0
Humanist Party (PH)	53	0.16	±0.00	0	±0
Blank ballots	1,352	4.17	+2.67		
Total	32,407			25	±0
Valid votes	32,407	99.26	−0.21		
Invalid votes	240	0.74	+0.21		
Votes cast / turnout	32,647	51.29	−10.04		
Abstentions	31,001	48.71	+10.04		
Registered voters	63,648				

=== L'Hospitalet de Llobregat ===
Population: 248,150

← Summary of the 27 May 2007 City Council of L'Hospitalet de Llobregat election results →
Parties and alliances	Popular vote			Seats	
Parties and alliances	Votes	%	±pp	Total	+/−
Socialists' Party of Catalonia–Municipal Progress (PSC–PM)	43,576	52.76	−0.42	17	+1
People's Party (PP)	12,294	14.88	−1.01	5	+1
Convergence and Union (CiU)	8,484	10.27	+0.49	3	±0
Initiative–EUiA–Agreement for Municipal Progress (ICV–EUiA–EPM)	7,368	8.92	−2.78	2	−1
Republican Left of Catalonia–Municipal Agreement (ERC–AM)	3,939	4.77	−0.68	0	−1
Citizens–Party of the Citizenry (C's)	3,105	3.76	New	0	±0
The Greens–Green Option (EV–OV)	1,174	1.42	New	0	±0
National Democracy (DN)	238	0.29	New	0	±0
Catalan Republican Party (RC)	227	0.27	New	0	±0
Unsubmissive Seats–Alternative of Discontented Democrats (Ei–ADD)	221	0.27	New	0	±0
Spain 2000 (E–2000)	84	0.10	New	0	±0
Blank ballots	1,886	2.28	+0.96		
Total	82,596			27	±0
Valid votes	82,596	99.66	+0.02		
Invalid votes	285	0.34	−0.02		
Votes cast / turnout	82,881	46.69	−8.12		
Abstentions	94,632	53.31	+8.12		
Registered voters	177,513				

=== Lleida ===
Population: 125,677

← Summary of the 27 May 2007 City Council of Lleida election results →
Parties and alliances	Popular vote			Seats	
Parties and alliances	Votes	%	±pp	Total	+/−
Socialists' Party of Catalonia–Municipal Progress (PSC–PM)	22,172	46.23	+9.93	15	+5
Convergence and Union (CiU)	9,613	20.04	−3.37	6	−1
People's Party (PP)	5,690	11.86	−2.04	3	−1
Republican Left of Catalonia–Municipal Agreement (ERC–AM)	3,336	6.96	−5.60	2	−1
Initiative–EUiA–Agreement for Municipal Progress (ICV–EUiA–EPM)	2,737	5.71	−4.58	1	−2
Popular Unity Candidacy (CUP)	1,030	2.15	New	0	±0
Citizens–Party of the Citizenry (C's)	981	2.05	New	0	±0
Organization of Independent Neighbours (OVI)	464	0.97	−0.70	0	±0
Civil Society (SOC)	158	0.33	New	0	±0
Family and Life Party (PFiV)	125	0.26	New	0	±0
Working Lleida (LT)	117	0.24	New	0	±0
Catalan Republican Party (RC)	93	0.19	New	0	±0
Platform for Catalonia (PxC)	62	0.13	New	0	±0
Humanist Party (PH)	45	0.09	−0.06	0	±0
Blank ballots	1,335	2.78	+1.16		
Total	47,958			27	±0
Valid votes	47,958	99.50	−0.13		
Invalid votes	242	0.50	+0.13		
Votes cast / turnout	48,200	51.80	−7.63		
Abstentions	44,846	48.20	+7.63		
Registered voters	93,046				

=== Mataró ===
Population: 118,748

← Summary of the 27 May 2007 City Council of Mataró election results →
Parties and alliances	Popular vote			Seats	
Parties and alliances	Votes	%	±pp	Total	+/−
Socialists' Party of Catalonia–Municipal Progress (PSC–PM)	13,690	34.49	+0.93	11	±0
Convergence and Union (CiU)	8,329	20.99	+0.71	7	+1
People's Party (PP)	5,632	14.19	−2.92	4	−1
Initiative–EUiA–Agreement for Municipal Progress (ICV–EUiA–EPM)	2,553	6.43	−5.19	2	−1
Republican Left of Catalonia–Municipal Agreement (ERC–AM)	2,434	6.13	−2.61	2	±0
Popular Unity Candidacy (CUP)	2,193	5.53	+3.22	1	+1
Neighbourhood Alternative of Mataró (AVdM)	1,843	4.64	−0.30	0	±0
Citizens–Party of the Citizenry (C's)	1,192	3.00	New	0	±0
Unitary Left (Esq–Uni)	321	0.81	New	0	±0
Platform for Catalonia (PxC)	135	0.34	New	0	±0
Catalan Republican Party (RC)	109	0.27	New	0	±0
Blank ballots	1,256	3.16	+1.71		
Total	39,687			27	±0
Valid votes	39,687	99.68	+0.01		
Invalid votes	128	0.32	−0.01		
Votes cast / turnout	39,815	46.22	−14.50		
Abstentions	46,328	53.78	+14.50		
Registered voters	86,143				

=== Reus ===
Population: 101,767

← Summary of the 27 May 2007 City Council of Reus election results →
Parties and alliances	Popular vote			Seats	
Parties and alliances	Votes	%	±pp	Total	+/−
Socialists' Party of Catalonia–Municipal Progress (PSC–PM)	12,091	33.36	−2.80	10	±0
Convergence and Union (CiU)	9,109	25.13	+2.95	8	+2
People's Party (PP)	4,705	12.98	−0.82	4	±0
Republican Left of Catalonia–Municipal Agreement (ERC–AM)	2,851	7.87	−4.00	2	−1
Initiative–EUiA–Agreement for Municipal Progress (ICV–EUiA–EPM)	2,483	6.85	−1.09	2	±0
Reus Independent Coordinator (CORI)	1,831	5.05	+1.81	1	+1
Citizens–Party of the Citizenry (C's)	1,161	3.20	New	0	±0
Independent Reus Platform–Federation of Independents (PRIM–FIC)	275	2.69	−0.40	0	±0
National Democracy (DN)	53	0.15	New	0	±0
Blank ballots	986	2.72	+1.01		
Total	36,245			27	+2
Valid votes	36,245	99.53	−0.07		
Invalid votes	170	0.47	+0.07		
Votes cast / turnout	36,415	49.92	−6.99		
Abstentions	36,535	50.08	+6.99		
Registered voters	72,950				

=== Sabadell ===
Population: 200,545

← Summary of the 27 May 2007 City Council of Sabadell election results →
Parties and alliances	Popular vote			Seats	
Parties and alliances	Votes	%	±pp	Total	+/−
Socialists' Party of Catalonia–Municipal Progress (PSC–PM)	30,091	41.08	−7.52	13	−2
Convergence and Union (CiU)	11,053	15.09	+2.28	5	+2
Initiative–EUiA–Agreement for Municipal Progress (ICV–EUiA–EPM)	9,550	13.04	+2.29	4	+1
People's Party (PP)	6,054	8.27	−0.80	2	±0
Agreement for Sabadell–Vallès Alternative Candidacies (ES–CAV)	5,969	8.15	+1.16	2	±0
Republican Left of Catalonia–Municipal Agreement (ERC–AM)	4,258	5.81	−3.21	1	−1
Citizens–Party of the Citizenry (C's)	2,073	2.83	New	0	±0
Citizen Platform for Sabadell (PCpS)	1,191	1.63	+0.99	0	±0
Family and Life Party (PFiV)	217	0.30	New	0	±0
Catalan Republican Party (RC)	211	0.29	New	0	±0
Unsubmissive Seats–Alternative of Discontented Democrats (Ei–ADD)	196	0.27	New	0	±0
Republican Left–Left Republican Party (IR–PRE)	148	0.20	−0.07	0	±0
Republican Social Movement (MSR)	144	0.20	−0.02	0	±0
Blank ballots	2,087	2.85	+1.62		
Total	73,242			27	±0
Valid votes	73,242	99.59	−0.10		
Invalid votes	302	0.41	+0.10		
Votes cast / turnout	73,544	48.02	−8.86		
Abstentions	79,600	51.98	+8.86		
Registered voters	153,144				

=== Sant Boi de Llobregat ===
Population: 81,368

← Summary of the 27 May 2007 City Council of Sant Boi de Llobregat election results →
Parties and alliances	Popular vote			Seats	
Parties and alliances	Votes	%	±pp	Total	+/−
Socialists' Party of Catalonia–Municipal Progress (PSC–PM)	12,567	44.76	−1.83	13	+1
Initiative–EUiA–Agreement for Municipal Progress (ICV–EUiA–EPM)	3,848	13.71	−6.49	3	−2
People's Party (PP)	3,789	13.50	−1.35	3	−1
Convergence and Union (CiU)	3,257	11.60	+3.91	3	+1
Republican Left of Catalonia–Municipal Agreement (ERC–AM)	2,354	8.38	−0.17	2	±0
Citizens–Party of the Citizenry (C's)	1,471	5.24	New	1	+1
Blank ballots	790	2.80	+1.18		
Total	28,076			25	±0
Valid votes	28,076	99.57	+0.01		
Invalid votes	120	0.43	−0.01		
Votes cast / turnout	28,196	45.19	−9.45		
Abstentions	34,194	54.81	+9.45		
Registered voters	62,390				

=== Sant Cugat del Vallès ===
Population: 73,774

← Summary of the 27 May 2007 City Council of Sant Cugat del Vallès election results →
Parties and alliances	Popular vote			Seats	
Parties and alliances	Votes	%	±pp	Total	+/−
Convergence and Union (CiU)	13,424	45.28	+8.03	14	+4
Socialists' Party–Citizens for Change–Municipal Progress (PSC–CpC–PM)	4,382	14.78	−7.35	4	−2
Initiative–EUiA–Agreement for Municipal Progress (ICV–EUiA–EPM)	3,454	11.65	−0.42	3	±0
People's Party (PP)	2,636	8.89	−2.43	2	−1
Republican Left of Catalonia–Municipal Agreement (ERC–AM)	2,378	8.02	−6.09	2	−1
Citizens–Party of the Citizenry (C's)	1,269	4.28	New	0	±0
Popular Unity Candidacy–Vallès Alternative Candidacies (CUP–CAV)	895	3.02	New	0	±0
Union of Independents of Sant Cugat (UNIS)	226	0.76	−0.67	0	±0
Catalan Republican Party (RC)	96	0.32	New	0	±0
Blank ballots	886	2.99	+1.31		
Total	29,646			25	±0
Valid votes	29,646	99.68	+0.09		
Invalid votes	95	0.32	−0.09		
Votes cast / turnout	29,741	57.28	−7.37		
Abstentions	22,181	42.72	+7.37		
Registered voters	51,922				

=== Santa Coloma de Gramenet ===
Population: 119,056

← Summary of the 27 May 2007 City Council of Santa Coloma de Gramenet election results →
Parties and alliances	Popular vote			Seats	
Parties and alliances	Votes	%	±pp	Total	+/−
Socialists' Party of Catalonia–Municipal Progress (PSC–PM)	20,260	53.83	+0.04	17	+1
People's Party (PP)	4,641	12.33	−1.65	4	±0
Initiative–EUiA–Agreement for Municipal Progress (ICV–EUiA–EPM)	4,575	12.15	−5.88	4	−1
Convergence and Union (CiU)	2,312	6.14	−2.08	2	±0
People of Gramenet (GG)	1,876	4.98	New	0	±0
Citizens–Party of the Citizenry (C's)	1,461	3.88	New	0	±0
Republican Left of Catalonia–Municipal Agreement (ERC–AM)	1,351	3.59	−0.26	0	±0
Communist Party of the Catalan People (PCPC)	256	0.68	New	0	±0
National Democracy (DN)	89	0.24	New	0	±0
Unsubmissive Seats–Alternative of Discontented Democrats (Ei–ADD)	84	0.22	New	0	±0
Blank ballots	735	1.95	+0.38		
Total	37,640			27	±0
Valid votes	37,640	99.70	−0.03		
Invalid votes	113	0.30	+0.03		
Votes cast / turnout	37,753	45.60	−6.78		
Abstentions	45,044	54.40	+6.78		
Registered voters	82,797				

=== Tarragona ===
Population: 131,158

← Summary of the 27 May 2007 City Council of Tarragona election results →
Parties and alliances	Popular vote			Seats	
Parties and alliances	Votes	%	±pp	Total	+/−
Socialists' Party of Catalonia–Municipal Progress (PSC–PM)	20,366	39.76	+8.22	13	+4
Convergence and Union (CiU)	11,819	23.07	−10.48	8	−2
People's Party (PP)	6,976	13.62	−1.23	4	±0
Republican Left of Catalonia–Municipal Agreement (ERC–AM)	3,938	7.69	−1.17	2	±0
Initiative–EUiA–Agreement for Municipal Progress (ICV–EUiA–EPM)	2,439	4.76	−4.00	0	−2
Citizens–Party of the Citizenry (C's)	1,917	3.74	New	0	±0
Independent Group Tarragona–Federation of Independents (TGI–FIC)	1,371	2.68	New	0	±0
Municipal Democratic Group (ADMC)	599	1.17	New	0	±0
We Are–People's Unity Assembly (NSom–AUP)	261	0.51	New	0	±0
Bloc of Committed Citizens (BCC)	258	0.50	New	0	±0
Unsubmissive Seats–Alternative of Discontented Democrats (Ei–ADD)	165	0.32	New	0	±0
Family and Life Party (PFiV)	64	0.12	New	0	±0
National Alliance (AN)	55	0.11	New	0	±0
Humanist Party (PH)	47	0.09	−0.10	0	±0
Blank ballots	948	1.85	+0.37		
Total	51,223			27	±0
Valid votes	51,223	99.57	−0.06		
Invalid votes	219	0.43	+0.06		
Votes cast / turnout	51,442	53.06	−7.45		
Abstentions	45,516	46.94	+7.45		
Registered voters	96,958				

=== Terrassa ===
Population: 199,817

← Summary of the 27 May 2007 City Council of Terrassa election results →
Parties and alliances	Popular vote			Seats	
Parties and alliances	Votes	%	±pp	Total	+/−
Socialists' Party of Catalonia–Municipal Progress (PSC–PM)	28,640	43.57	±0.00	13	±0
Convergence and Union (CiU)	13,041	19.84	+1.98	6	+1
Initiative–EUiA–Agreement for Municipal Progress (ICV–EUiA–EPM)	6,736	10.25	−2.56	3	±0
People's Party (PP)	6,468	9.84	−2.52	3	±0
Republican Left of Catalonia–Municipal Agreement (ERC–AM)	4,870	7.41	−3.46	2	−1
Citizens–Party of the Citizenry (C's)	2,547	3.87	New	0	±0
Popular Unity Candidacy–Vallès Alternative Candidacies (CUP–CAV)	848	1.29	+0.76	0	±0
Family and Life Party (PFiV)	323	0.49	New	0	±0
Catalan Republican Party (RC)	195	0.30	New	0	±0
Blank ballots	2,071	3.15	+1.72		
Total	65,739			27	±0
Valid votes	65,739	99.54	−0.13		
Invalid votes	305	0.46	+0.13		
Votes cast / turnout	66,044	44.29	−10.07		
Abstentions	83,087	55.71	+10.07		
Registered voters	149,131				
