= Girona =

City in Catalonia, Spain

Girona Gerona
- City and municipality
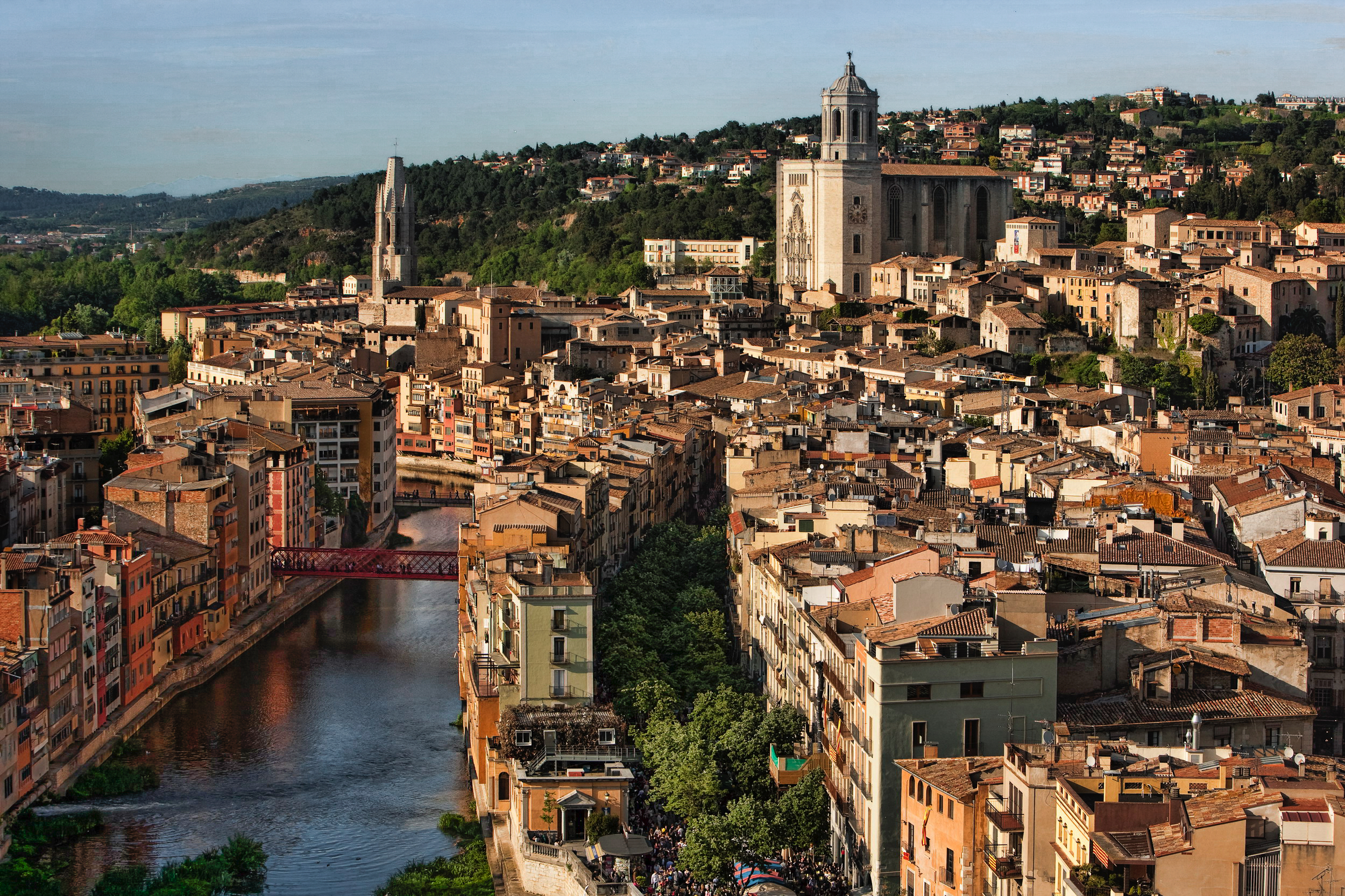
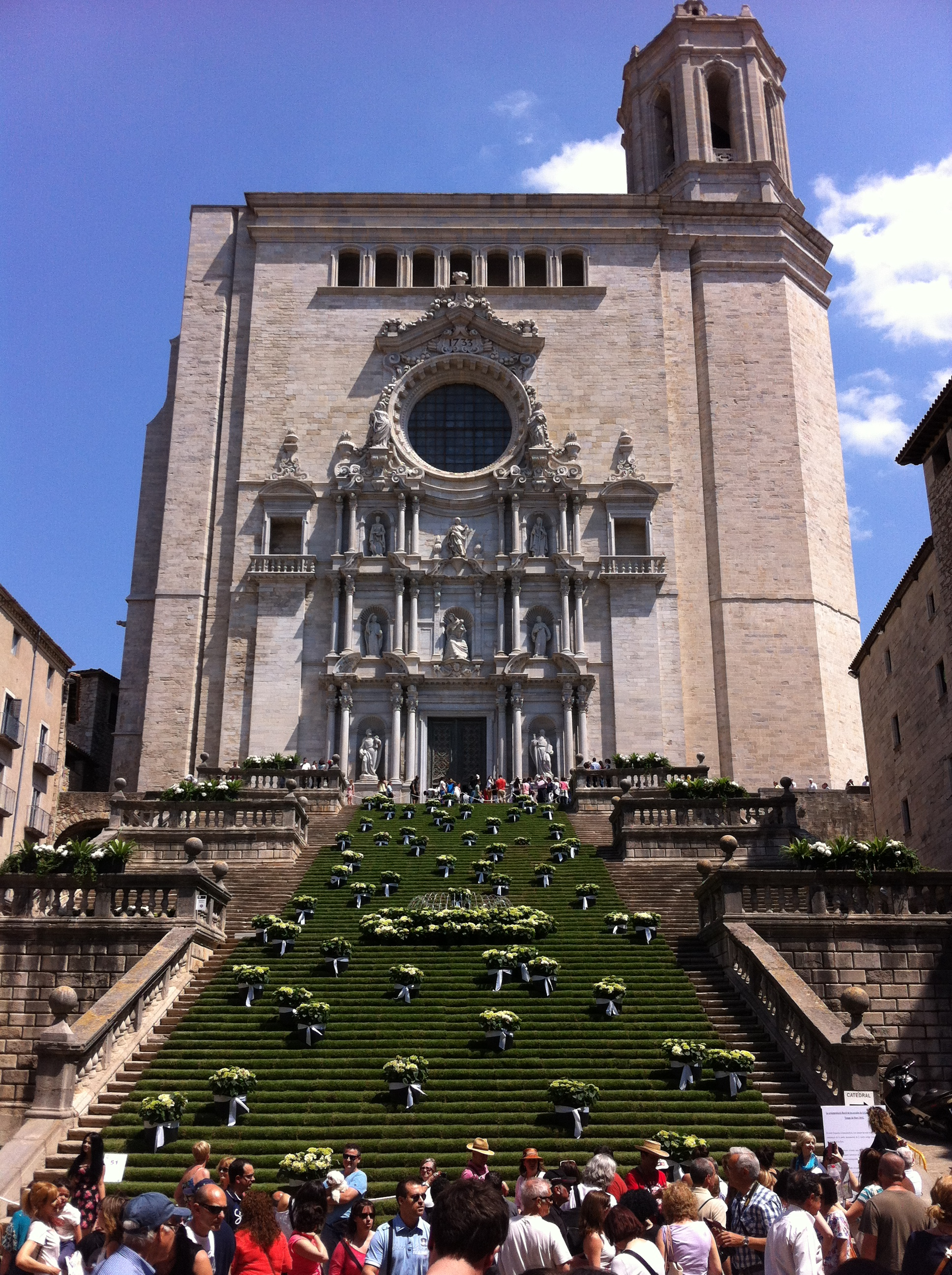
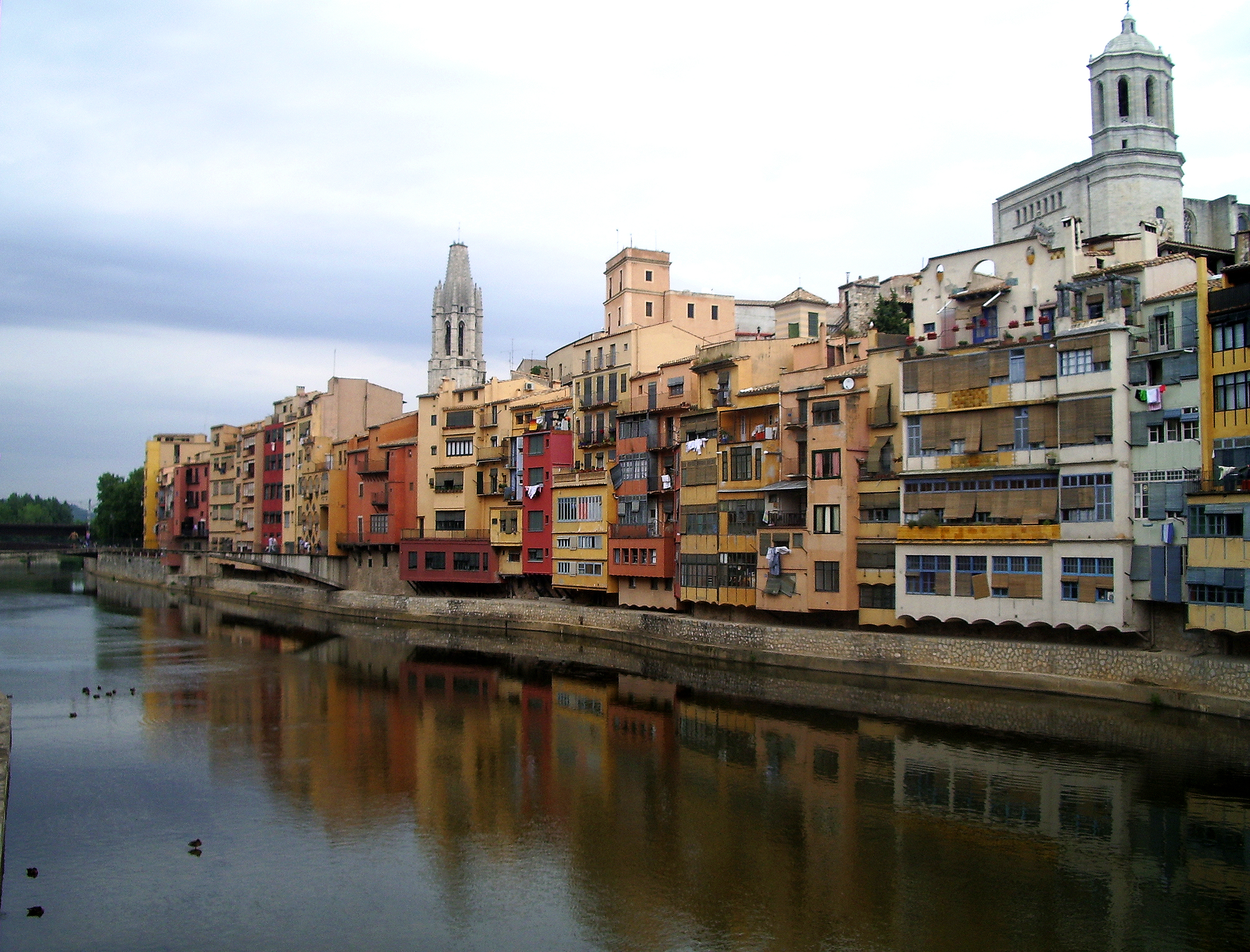
- Aerial view Girona Cathedral the Onyar

- Flag Coat of arms
- Interactive map of Girona
- Location within Catalonia Location within Spain
- Coordinates: 41°59′04″N 02°49′16″E
- Country: Spain
- Autonomous community: Catalonia
- Province: Girona
- Comarca: Gironès

Government
  - Mayor: Lluc Salellas i Vilar (2023) (Guanyem Girona)

Area
  - City and municipality: 39.1 km^{2} (15.1 sq mi)
- Elevation (AMSL): 76 m (249 ft)

Population (2025-01-01)
  - City and municipality: 108,666
  - Density: 2,500/km^{2} (6,600/sq mi)
  - Urban: 156,423
- Demonyms: Gironí, gironina
- Area code: +34 (E) + 972 (Gi)
- Administrative divisions: 9
- Website: web.girona.cat

Girona, (Note: Pronunciation of Girona: Catalan: [ʒiˈɾonə] Spanish: [ɟʝiˈɾona]) also known in Spanish as Gerona, (Note: Pronunciation of Gerona (unofficial): Spanish: [xeˈɾona]) is the capital city of the Province of Girona in the autonomous community of Catalonia, Spain, at the confluence of the Ter, Onyar, Galligants, and Güell rivers. The city had an official population of 108,352 in 2025, but the population of the Girona–Salt urban area is estimated to be about 156,400 (2020). Girona is also capital of the comarca of the Gironès and the vegueria of Girona. Since much of the old quarter of this ancient city has been preserved, Girona is a popular tourist destination. The city is located 99 km (62 mi) northeast of Barcelona.

== History ==
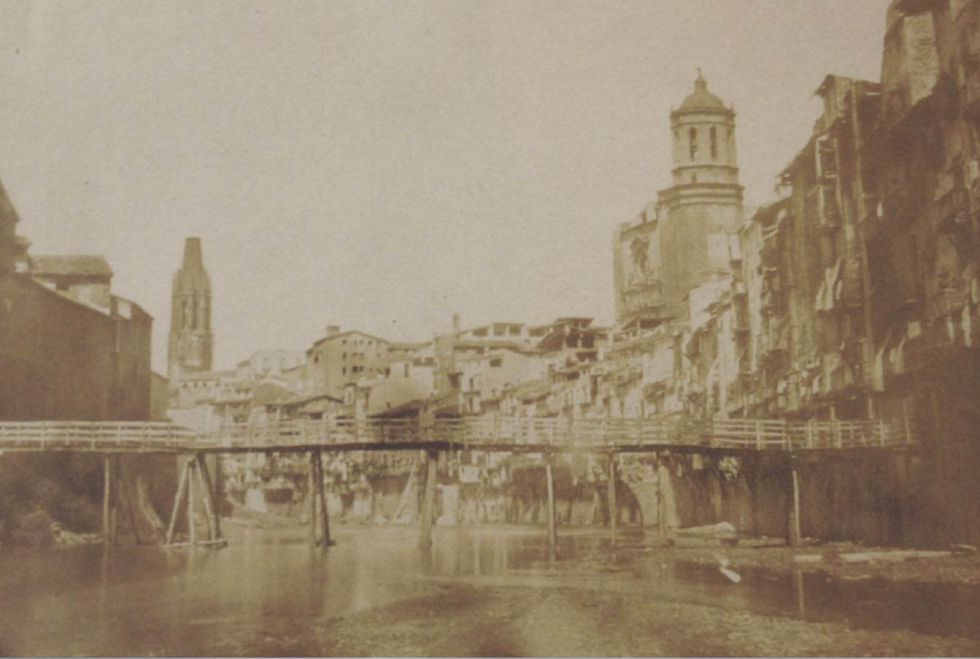
Onyar river in Girona, c. 1852

The first historical inhabitants in the region were Iberians; Girona is the ancient Gerunda, a city of the Ausetani. Later, the Romans built a citadel there, which was given the name of Gerunda. The Visigoths ruled in Girona until it was conquered by the Moors in 715. Charlemagne reconquered it in 785 and made it one of the fourteen original counties of Catalonia. It was sacked by the Moors in 827, 842, 845, 935, and 982. Wilfred the Hairy incorporated Girona into the County of Barcelona in 878.

In the 11th century, Alfonso II of Aragon and I of Barcelona declared Girona a city. The ancient county became a duchy within the Principality of Catalonia in 1351 when King Peter III of Aragon gave the title of Duke to his first-born son, John. In 1414, King Ferdinand I in turn gave the title of Prince of Girona to his first-born son, Alfonso. The title is currently carried by Princess Leonor of Asturias, the second since the 16th century to do so.

The earliest documented evidence of a Jewish Catalan community in Girona dates to about 885. The 12th century saw the Jewish community of Girona flourish, having one of the most important Kabbalistic schools in Europe. The Rabbi of Girona, Moshe ben Nahman Gerondi (better known as Nahmanides or Ramban) was appointed Great Rabbi of Catalonia. Centred on the Jewish Call (Call Jueu), the Jewish community of Girona came to an end in 1492, when the Catholic Monarchs outlawed Judaism throughout Spain and Jews were given the choice of conversion or exile (see Alhambra Decree). For 400 years before that time, the Jewish cemetery was located beside the road to France, just north of the old city between the mountain Montjuïc, or Jewish Mountain in medieval Catalan, and the river Ter.

Girona has undergone twenty-five sieges throughout its history. It was besieged by the French royal armies under Charles de Monchy d'Hocquincourt in 1653, under Bernardin Gigault de Bellefonds in 1684, and twice in 1694 under Anne Jules de Noailles. During the Third siege of Girona of the Peninsular War, the city was besieged from May to December 1809 by 35,000 French Napoleonic troops under Vergier, Augereau and Gouvion Saint-Cyr. Continuously under heavy bombardment, Girona held out obstinately under the leadership of Álvarez de Castro until disease and famine compelled it to capitulate on 12 December. Girona was the centre of the Ter department during the French rule, which lasted from 1809 to 1813. The defensive city walls of the western side were demolished at the turn of the 20th century to allow for the expansion of the city, while the walls of the eastern side remained untouched but abandoned.

Between 1983 and 2003, the missing parts of the city walls on the eastern side of the city were reconstructed. A walking route following the walls, known as el Passeig de la Muralla, is now a popular tourist route around the old city.

== Geography ==
Girona was founded in a strategic location along a natural corridor between the Empordà plain and the Catalan Coastal Depression, thereby connecting the Costa Brava and France to the north with Barcelona and other population centres in the south of Catalonia. This corridor is a defile formed by the Ter river between the Gavarres massif and the Catalan Transversal Range.

The Ter river is the most important water course in the region. In Girona it flows through the north of the town, from southwest to northeast. It is in Girona where the Ter meets the Onyar, the second largest river in the area. The Onyar crosses the city from south to north and it has historically conditioned the city's development, as catastrophic floods have periodically affected the town since historic times.

=== Seismic activity ===
Girona is located in a seismic zone, which means it occasionally has earthquakes throughout the year. Most of them are not felt, and some are felt as a minor vibration or light shaking. The strongest earthquake recorded in Girona was the magnitude 6.7 Principality of Catalonia 1428 earthquake.

=== Climate ===
According to the Köppen climate classification, Girona has a humid subtropical climate (Cfa), with hot summers and cool winters. In winter, frost occurs frequently (41.3 days per year from November to March), but snowfall is quite rare. Temperatures in winter can drop to below −2 °C (28 °F)/−3 °C (27 °F), especially during days with thermal inversion. Maximum temperatures in summer above 40 °C (104 °F) are very rare. Average annual rainfall is usually slightly above 700 mm (28 in). The wettest seasons are autumn (September–November) and spring (April–early June). Thunderstorms can occur throughout the year, more frequently in summer, averaging 23.9 days per year. but usually there still is a significant arid period. This can be seen through the natural vegetation around the city, as drought-tolerant oaks (Quercus ilex and, to a lesser extent, Quercus suber and Quercus pubescens) and pines (Pinus pinaster, Pinus pinea and Pinus halepensis) dominate the majority of plant communities.

Climate data for Girona Airport (1991-2020), extremes (1973-present)
Month	Jan	Feb	Mar	Apr	May	Jun	Jul	Aug	Sep	Oct	Nov	Dec	Year
Record high °C (°F)	24.6 (76.3)	25.8 (78.4)	29.0 (84.2)	31.6 (88.9)	37.3 (99.1)	43.0 (109.4)	41.6 (106.9)	42.5 (108.5)	37.0 (98.6)	33.1 (91.6)	30.0 (86.0)	23.5 (74.3)	43.0 (109.4)
Mean daily maximum °C (°F)	13.7 (56.7)	14.7 (58.5)	17.4 (63.3)	19.6 (67.3)	23.3 (73.9)	27.8 (82.0)	30.6 (87.1)	30.7 (87.3)	26.6 (79.9)	22.4 (72.3)	17.1 (62.8)	14.1 (57.4)	21.5 (70.7)
Daily mean °C (°F)	7.5 (45.5)	8.2 (46.8)	10.8 (51.4)	13.1 (55.6)	16.8 (62.2)	21.1 (70.0)	23.9 (75.0)	24.0 (75.2)	20.3 (68.5)	16.5 (61.7)	11.2 (52.2)	8.1 (46.6)	15.1 (59.2)
Mean daily minimum °C (°F)	1.3 (34.3)	1.6 (34.9)	4.1 (39.4)	6.5 (43.7)	10.2 (50.4)	14.4 (57.9)	17.1 (62.8)	17.2 (63.0)	14.0 (57.2)	10.6 (51.1)	5.3 (41.5)	2.0 (35.6)	8.7 (47.7)
Record low °C (°F)	−13.0 (8.6)	−8.2 (17.2)	−5.8 (21.6)	−3.0 (26.6)	0.6 (33.1)	5.1 (41.2)	8.0 (46.4)	8.4 (47.1)	4.6 (40.3)	−2.0 (28.4)	−7.0 (19.4)	−9.4 (15.1)	−13.0 (8.6)
Average precipitation mm (inches)	58 (2.3)	42 (1.7)	51 (2.0)	66 (2.6)	65 (2.6)	58 (2.3)	40 (1.6)	49 (1.9)	75 (3.0)	86 (3.4)	63 (2.5)	51 (2.0)	704 (27.9)
Average precipitation days (≥ 1 mm)	4.8	4.4	5.2	7.2	7.1	5.1	3.8	5.1	6.5	6.6	5.1	4.1	65
Average snowy days	0.2	0.5	0.1	0	0	0	0	0	0	0	0	0.1	0.9
Average relative humidity (%)	74	71	70	68	66	60	58	62	70	75	75	76	69
Mean monthly sunshine hours	155	167	195	204	229	255	288	273	210	183	153	143	2,455
Percentage possible sunshine	52	55	53	51	51	56	62	64	56	53	52	50	55
Source: Agencia Estatal de Meteorología

== Main sights ==
Girona is a popular destination for tourists and day-trippers from Barcelona. The old town stands on the steep hill of the Caputxins to the east of the river Onyar, while the more modern section stands on the plains to the west. The city has a number of Art Nouveau buildings including the Farinera Teixidor by Rafael Masó i Valentí.

=== Cathedral ===
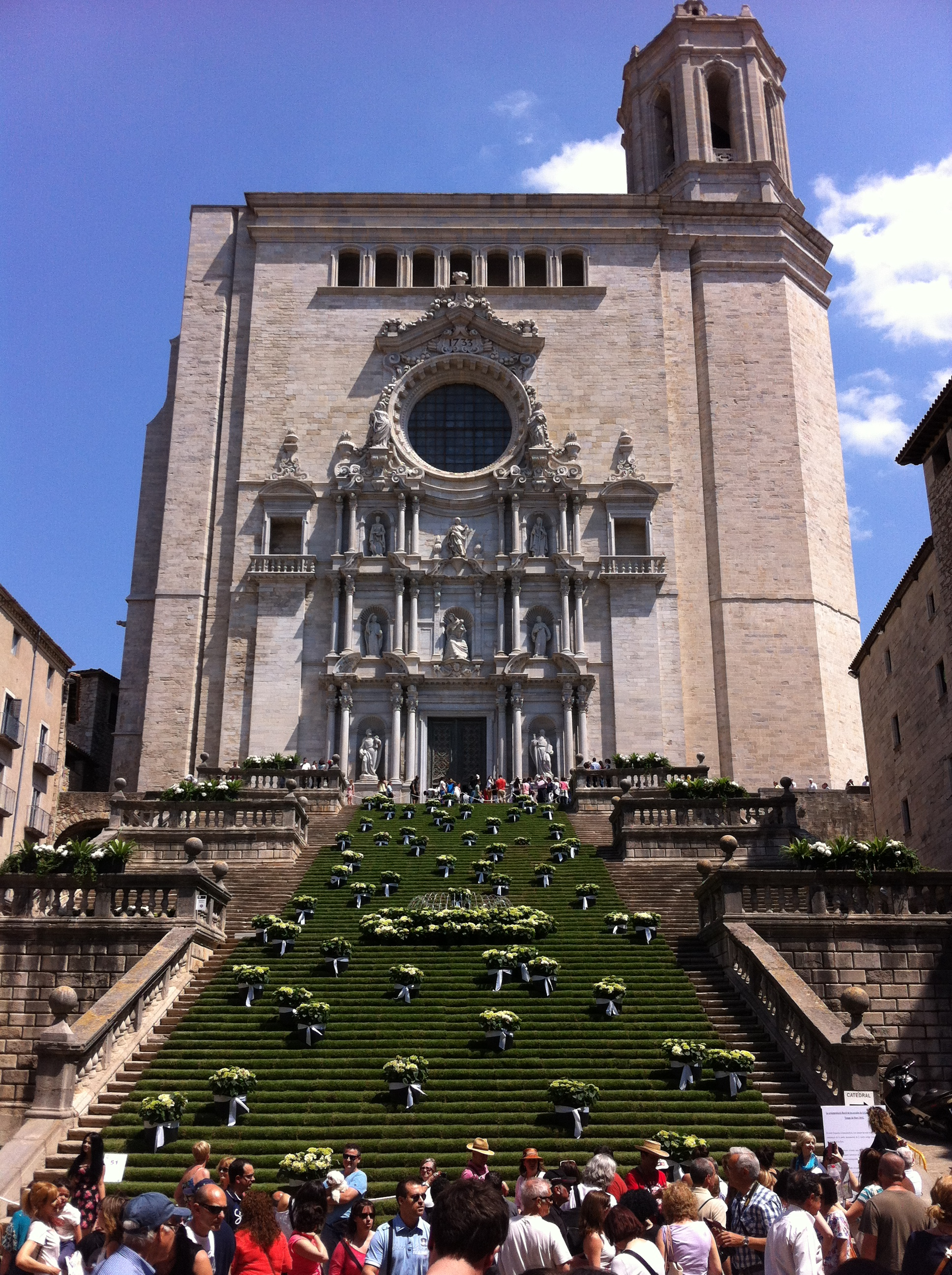
Girona cathedral during the annual flower exhibition

The ancient cathedral, which stood on the site of the present one, was used by the Moors as a mosque, and after their final expulsion was either entirely remodelled or rebuilt. The existing structure is one of the most important monuments of the school of the Majorcan architect Jaume Fabre and an excellent example of Catalan Gothic architecture. It is approached in ninety steps. An aisle and chapels surround the choir, which opens by three arches into the nave, of which the pointed stone vault is the second widest in the world (22.98 m), second only to that of St. Peter's Basilica in Rome. Among its interior decorations is the 14th century altarpiece which is the work of Valencian silversmith Pere Berneç. It is divided into three tiers of statuettes and reliefs, framed in canopied niches of cast and hammered silver. A gold and silver altar-frontal was carried off by the French in 1809. The cathedral contains the tombs of Ramon Berenguer and his wife.

=== Old fortifications ===
The old fortifications are another popular sight. Historically, these played a vital role in protecting Girona from invaders for hundreds of years. The city wall of the old town was an important military construction built in Roman times in the 1st century BC. It was thoroughly rebuilt under the reign of Peter III the Ceremonious in the second half of the 14th century, with the Roman wall used as a foundation. At the start of the 16th century, the wall was absorbed into the city and the walled precinct lost its military value. Bit by bit, the wall was degrading, as parts were gradually altered from the inside and the outside, until the walls were almost entirely demolished at the beginning of the 20th century. The remaining walls and lookout towers that make up these fortifications are today split in two – a small section to the north of the old town, and a much larger section to the east and south which was reconstructed in the period 1983–2003. It is now possible to walk the walls and climb the towers, from which visitors can enjoy panoramic views of Girona and the surrounding countryside.

=== Sant Feliu ===
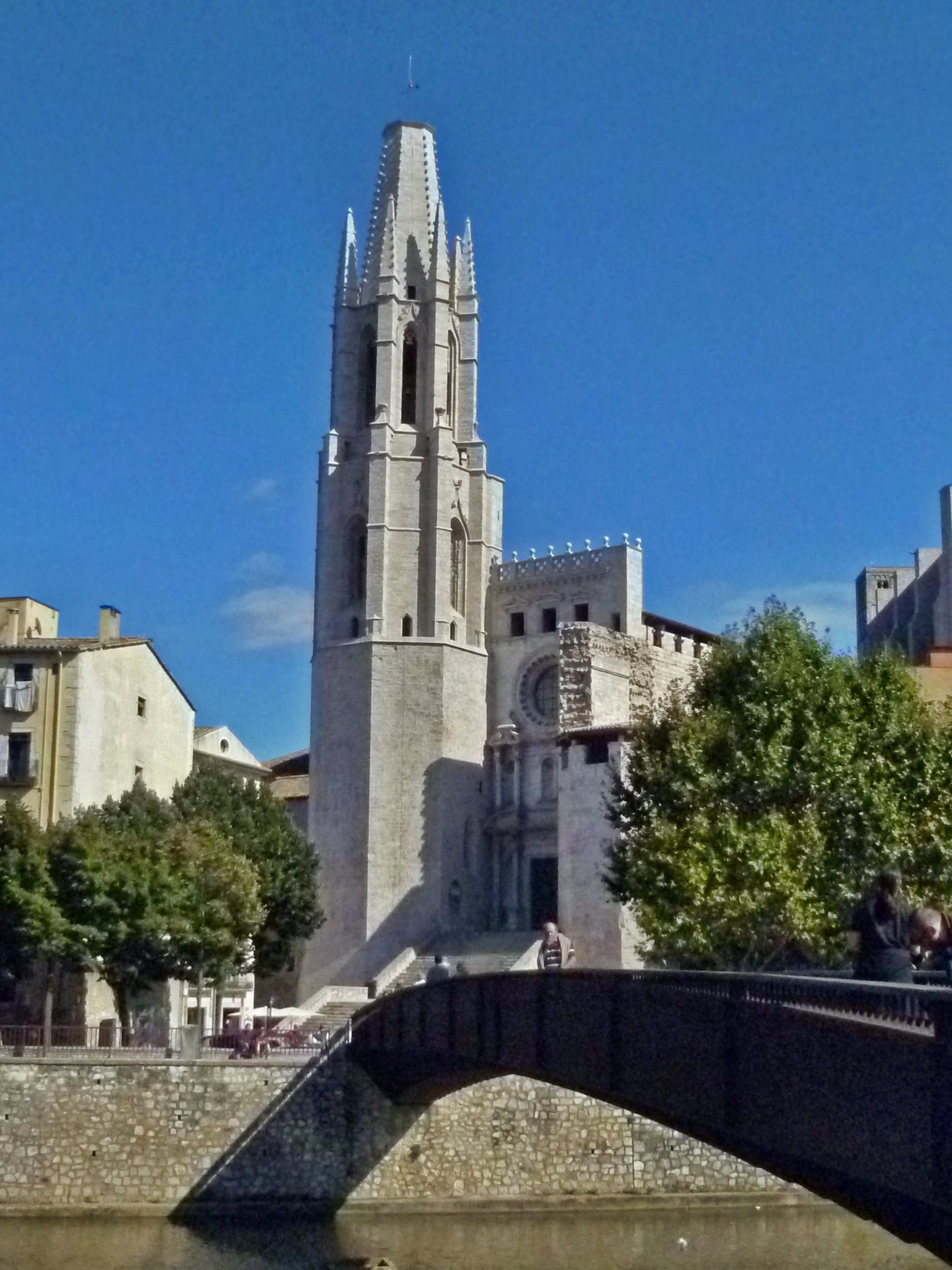
The Collegiate Church of Sant Feliu, as seen from the river Onyar

The Collegiate Church of Sant Feliu is noteworthy from an architectural point of view. Its principal style is 14th-century Gothic, although the façade dates from the 18th, and it is one of the few Spanish churches that possesses a genuine spire. It contains, besides the sepulchre of its patron and the tomb of the valiant Álvarez, a chapel dedicated to St. Narcissus, who according to tradition was one of the early bishops of the See of Girona.

=== Sant Pere de Galligants ===
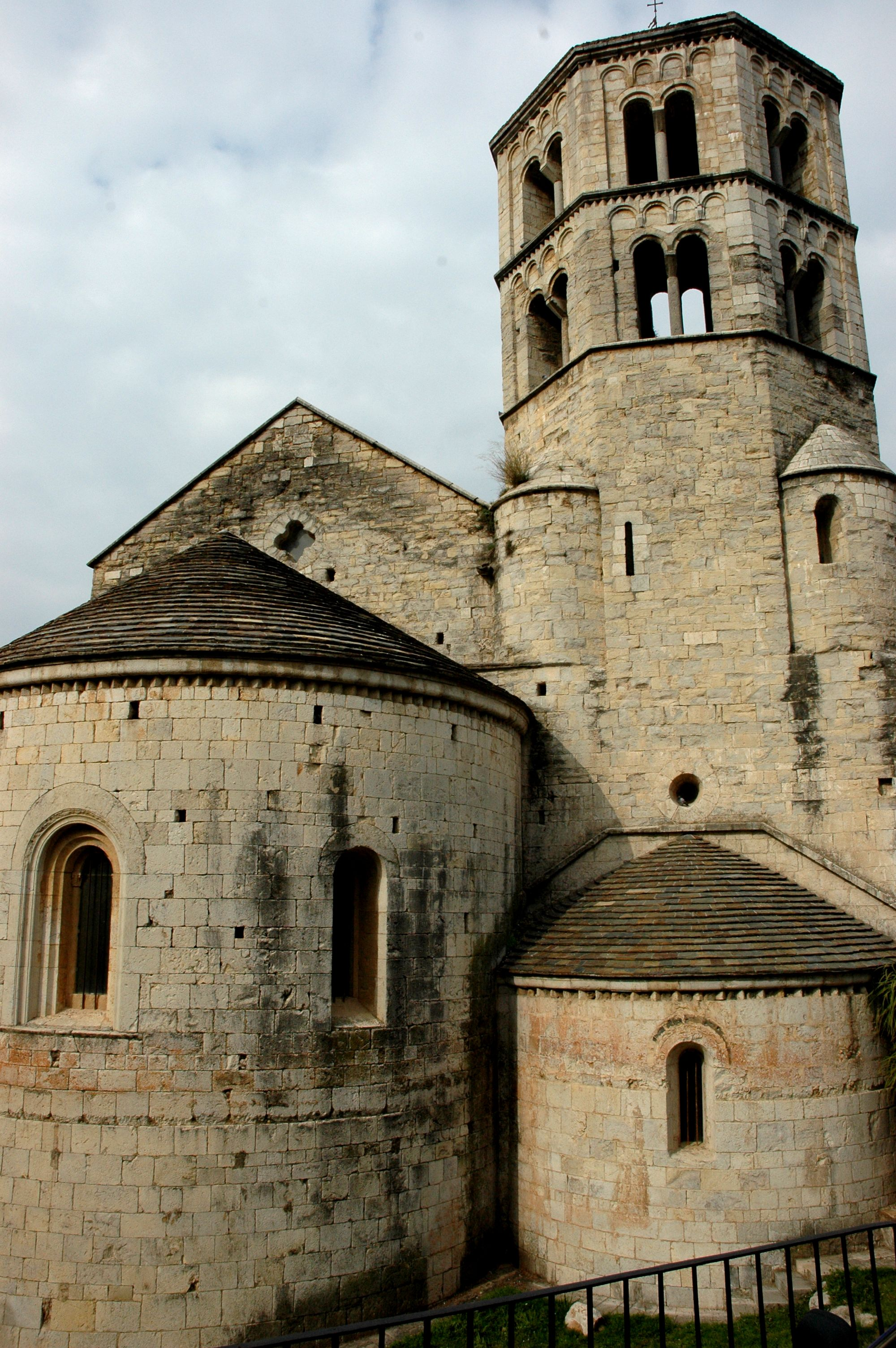
Sant Pere de Galligants

The Benedictine church of the monastery of Sant Pere de Galligants is in the early Romanesque style, dating to about the year 1130, though the monastery dates to about 950. The monastery slightly predates the Monastery of St. Daniel.

=== Plaça de la Independència ===
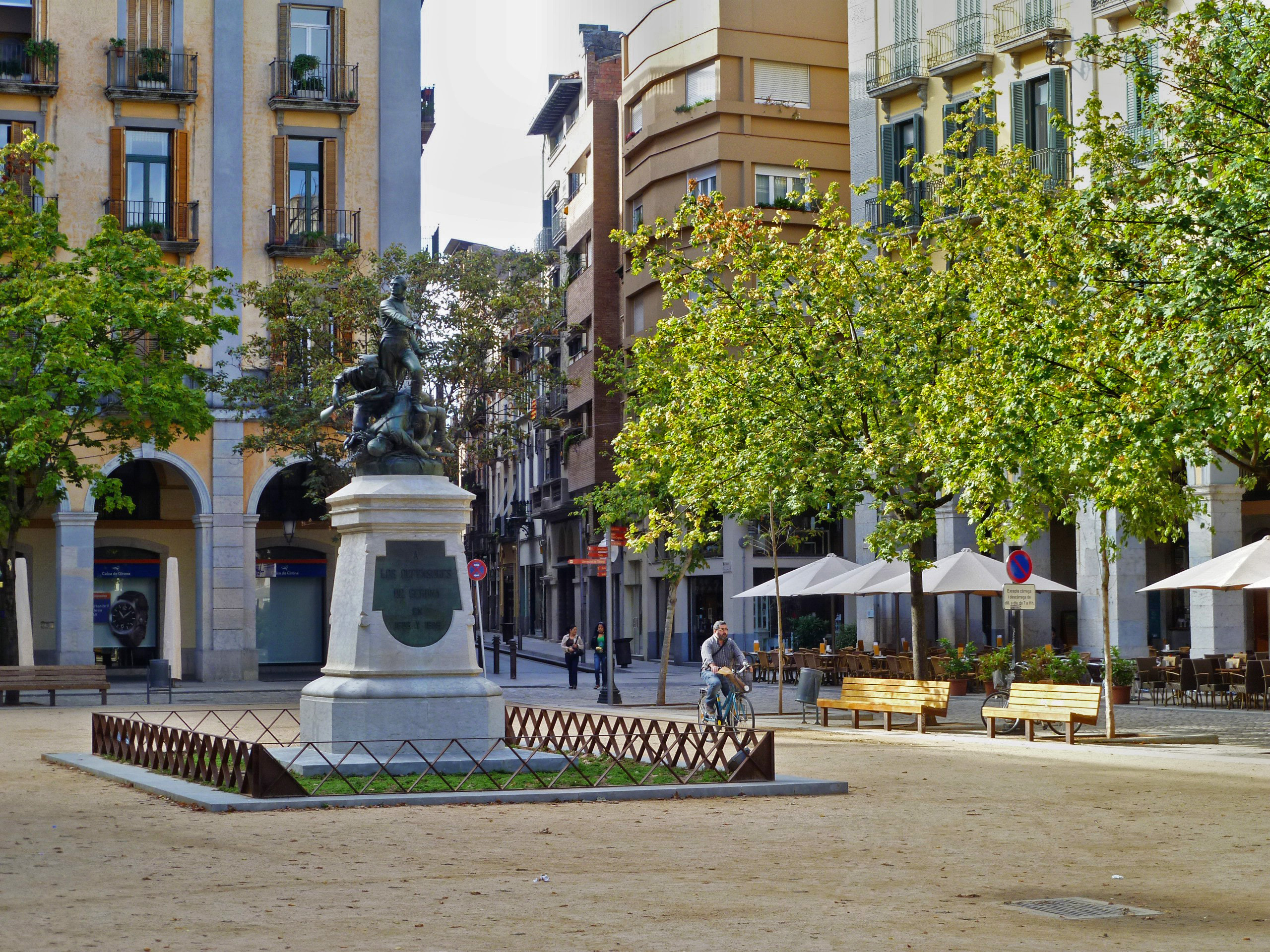
The Independence Square monument honors the city's defenders during the sieges of 1808 and 1809.

The Plaça de la Independència is one of the best-known and busiest squares in Girona. Located in the Mercadal district in the city centre, it is also known as Plaça de Sant Agustí, after the former Convent of Sant Agustí. Its name refers to the 1808–1814 War of Spanish Independence, part of the larger Peninsular War, against Napoleon Bonaparte.

The interest of the square lies in its 19th-century style, despite it being surrounded by identical austere neoclassical buildings with porches dedicated to the defenders of the city of Girona during the 1808 and 1809 sieges.

However, the symmetrical proportions of the square correspond more to contemporary interventions than its architectural past. The municipal architect Martí Sureda i Deulovol was the first to conceive a porticoed square with closed and neoclassical loops, and with some buildings having matching aesthetic proportions. The development of the area followed this scheme only in part, as the construction of the first theatres in the city did not follow the original concept of Martí Sureda. The surrounding part of the city is primarily constructed in the Noucentisme architectural style of the early 20th century, and the area is now a lively social and commercial hub with an abundance of cafés and restaurants, including some well-known historic establishments like the Café Royal, Cinema Albéniz and Casa Marieta.

=== Cases de l'Onyar ===
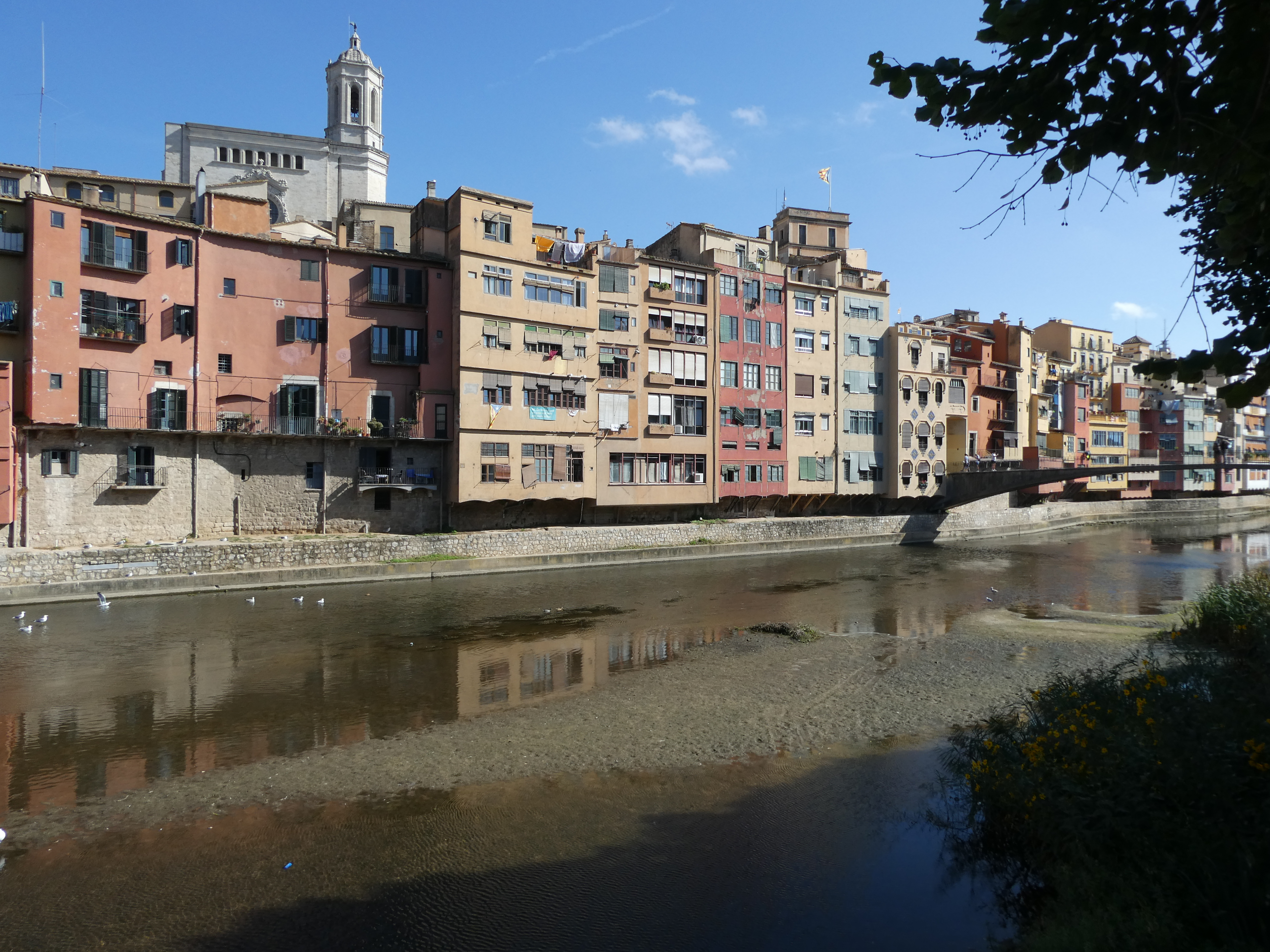
Houses on the river Onyar

The picturesque houses overlooking the river Onyar are seen as an iconic image of Girona, but their current appearance is relatively recent. The houses were built over many years from the 17th to 20th century, although most date to the 19th century and were not originally seen with the multicoloured appearance of today. The façades were painted and restored in a palette of 29 colours, an idea conceived during the later years of the Franco dictatorship by local artists Enric Ansesa and James J. Faixó and ultimately realized in 1982. Ansesa has since related the symbolism of the colours as a "great signal of change" following the end of Francoism, contrasting this with the city of his youth which he described as a "Girona in black and white, a city of grief and funerals, of the religious fundamentalism of the first Fridays of the month”.

One of these houses (at Ballesteries 29, Girona) is Casa Masó, the birthplace of the architect Rafael Masó i Valentí and an example of Noucentisme in Girona. Since 2006 it has been the headquarters of the Fundació Rafael Masó. The façade abutting the river can be recognised by its unique white color.

=== Jewish heritage ===
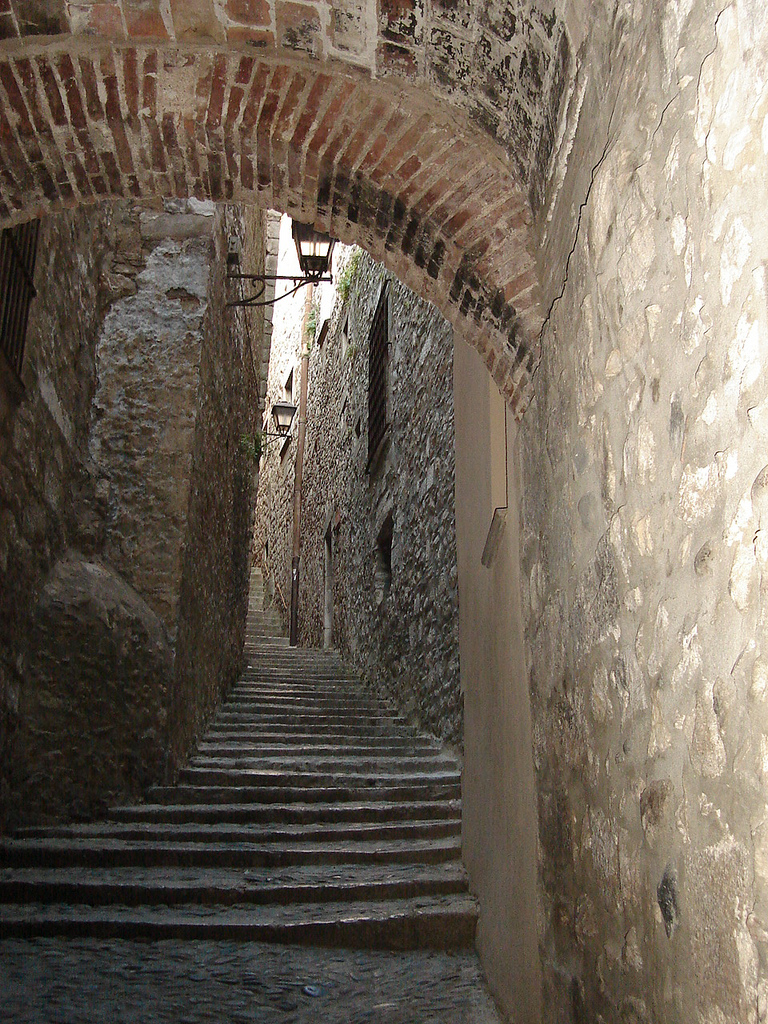
A lane in the Jewish Quarter. Girona's Jewish community was lost as a result of the Expulsion.

The historic Jewish quarter or Call has been the centre of archaeological and restoration work in recent decades. In 1492, at the culmination of a period of increasing repression, the remaining Jewish community in Girona was forced to choose between conversion and expulsion. After the expulsion of the Jews, the neighbourhood was sealed off and new houses were built over the old ones. When the dictator Francisco Franco died in November 1975, interest in the region's cultural history was revived. Some of the old buildings were excavated leading to the discovery of the home of Nahmanides, which was sold to the city in 1987.

A rectangular indentation that once held a mezuzah can be seen at the entrance of a number of buildings in the Call, such as the doorway of an old building on Carrer de Sant Llorenç. The Centre Bonastruc ça Porta on Carrer de la Força is the site of a 15th century synagogue, and the building today hosts the Girona Museum of Jewish History and the Nahmanides Institute for Jewish Studies. Excavations in the early 2000s also turned up 1,200 old documents, including Talmudic commentaries, accounts of Jewish domestic life, a description of the ancient synagogue and the names of Girona Jews who converted to Christianity in 1492.

== Culture ==
=== Popular culture ===
Girona has been the setting for several TV shows and films:

- Several scenes of season 6 of Game of Thrones were shot in Girona.
- Scenes for the live-action Tomb Raider series were filmed in Girona in June 2026.
- Disney filmed scenes for its live-action adaptation of Tangled in Girona in July 2026.

=== Sports ===
During the professional cycling season, various non-European pro cyclists have called Girona home, as illustrated in the book by Michael Barry, written during his time with the US Postal Service cycling team. Between races, cyclists do their training rides outside the city, which provides excellent training terrain.

In the spring of 1997, Marty Jemison, Tyler Hamilton and George Hincapie moved to Girona as teammates on the US Postal Service Professional Cycling Team. This was the first year that American cyclists started living in Girona and meeting for training rides at the Pont de Pedra. Later, other well-known professional cyclists such as Lance Armstrong came to live in the city.

Football is also widely popular. The local club is Girona FC, who were promoted to La Liga in 2017. In the 2023-24 season, Girona finished third in La Liga, their best-ever league position, and qualified for the UEFA Champions League for the first time in their history, having led the division until December. They were eliminated in the league phase of the 2024-25 Champions League. However, the club was relegated from La Liga after the 2025-26 season. The club's stadium is Estadi Montilivi.

The city has a roller hockey team, Girona Club Hoquei, one of the most important in Spain, which competes in the OK Liga.

== Education ==
The city is the home of the Jaume Vicens Vives Secondary School, as well as the Universitat de Girona (University of Girona).

== Economy and infrastructure ==
=== Transport ===
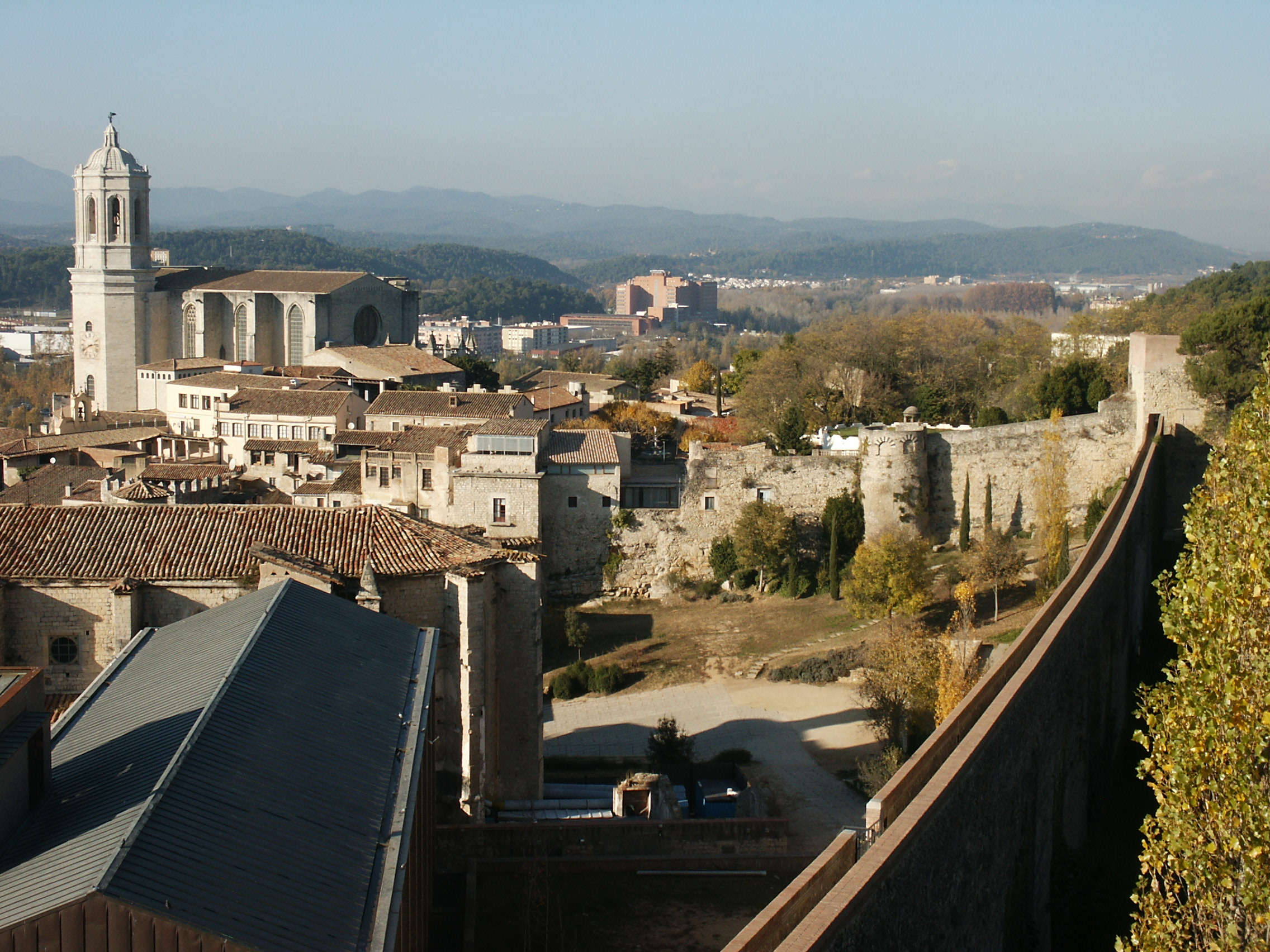
Girona landmarks include Saint Mary's Cathedral (left) and the City Walls Walkway (right).

==== Road ====
The town is on the Autopista AP-7 and N-II. The city is also the hub of the local road network with routes to the coast and inland towards the Pyrenees.

==== Buses ====
The city has a comprehensive urban bus service operated by private companies. There are also services to the other towns in the Girona province and long-distance buses.

==== Rail ====
Girona is served at its new railway station to the west of the Old Town. There are conventional trains from Barcelona to Portbou and the French border.

Girona is also an important stop on the AVE services from Paris, Marseille, Toulouse and Figueres to Barcelona, and from Figueres to Barcelona and Madrid.

The journey time to Barcelona is approximately 1 hour 35 minutes on the stopping "Regional" trains, 1 hour and 15 minutes by conventional train ("Media Distancia") or 37 minutes on the AVE. Madrid is reached in 3 h 45 min, also on the AVE.

==== Airport ====
The town's airport, Girona-Costa Brava, is 10 kilometres (6 miles) south of the town centre. It grew tremendously principally as a result of Ryanair choosing it as one of their European hubs, but then shrank again after they relocated most of the flights to Barcelona El Prat.

Girona Airport is approximately a 30-minute bus ride from the bus terminal and train station in Girona city, and an hour from Barcelona centre, 92 km (57 mi) to the south. The bus stops in the centre of Barcelona, at the Estació d'Autobusos Barcelona Nord, Barcelona's main bus terminal.

Most low-cost airlines mention "Barcelona" in their descriptions of Girona airport.

== Government ==
=== Results of the elections since 1931 ===
City councelors in the City Council of Girona since 1931
Key to parties PCR Other left LR Other monarchists Other right LR PSUC CUP Guanyem Girona IC ICV–EUiA PSC ERC UCD Junts TriasxBCN CiU Cs AP PP Vox
Election	Distribution	Mayor	Government Composition
1931	11 / 4 / 5 / 3	Miquel Santaló (ERC) (1931-1934)	Santaló; ERC
1931	11 / 4 / 5 / 3	Josep Maria Dalmau (ERC) (1934)	Dalmau; ERC
1934	6 / 1 / 10 / 6 / 1	Francesc Tomàs (Lliga) (1934-1936)	Tomàs; Lliga
1934	6 / 1 / 10 / 6 / 1	Llorenç Busquets (ERC) (1936)	Busquets I ERC
1934	6 / 1 / 10 / 6 / 1	Joaquim de Camps (ERC) (1936)	De Camps; ERC
1934	6 / 1 / 10 / 6 / 1	Expedit Duran (CNT) (1936-1937)	Duran; CNT–FAI
1934	6 / 1 / 10 / 6 / 1	Llorenç Busquets (ERC) (1937)	Busquets II; ERC
1934	6 / 1 / 10 / 6 / 1	Pere Cerezo (ERC) (1937-1939)	Cerezo; ERC
1934	6 / 1 / 10 / 6 / 1	Joan Ballesta (PSUC) (1939)	Ballesta; PSUC–CNT–UGT
1939–1979: Francoist dictatorship. During this interval, no elections were held.		Directly appointed by the Civil Governor of Girona	
1979	4 / 9 / 5 / 7	Joaquim Nadal (PSC) (1979-2002)	Nadal I PSC
1983	1 / 15 / 6 / 3	Joaquim Nadal (PSC) (1979-2002)	Nadal II; PSC
1987	14 / 9 / 2	Joaquim Nadal (PSC) (1979-2002)	Nadal III; PSC
1991	1 / 13 / 9 / 2	Joaquim Nadal (PSC) (1979-2002)	Nadal IV; PSC
1995	1 / 2 / 14 / 5 / 3	Joaquim Nadal (PSC) (1979-2002)	Nadal V PSC
1999	1 / 2 / 14 / 6 / 2	Joaquim Nadal (PSC) (1979-2002)	Nadal VI; PSC
1999	1 / 2 / 14 / 6 / 2	Anna Pagans (PSC) (2002-2011)	Pagans I PSC
2003	2 / 4 / 11 / 5 / 3	Anna Pagans (PSC) (2002-2011)	Pagans II; PSC
2007	3 / 4 / 10 / 6 / 2	Anna Pagans (PSC) (2002-2011)	Pagans III; PSC
2011	2 / 3 / 7 / 10 / 3	Carles Puigdemont (CiU) (2011-2016)	Puigdemont I CiU
2015	4 / 4 / 4 / 10 / 2 / 1	Carles Puigdemont (CiU) (2011-2016)	Puigdemont II; CiU
2015	4 / 4 / 4 / 10 / 2 / 1	Albert Ballesta (CiU) (2016)	Ballesta; CiU
2015	4 / 4 / 4 / 10 / 2 / 1	Marta Madrenas (CiU, JxCat, Junts) (2016-2023)	Madrenas I CiU, JxCat
2019	6 / 4 / 6 / 9 / 2	Marta Madrenas (CiU, JxCat, Junts) (2016-2023)	Madrenas II; JxCat until Sept 2020; Junts–ERC from Sept 2020
2023	8 / 3 / 8 / 6 / 1 / 1	Lluc Salellas (CUP)	Salellas; Guanyem–Junts–ERC

== Notable people ==
- Maria Pilar Bruguera Sábat (1906–1994), Roman Catholic nun and physician
- Josep Maria Corredor i Pomés (1912–1981), cultural activist
- Xavier Cugat (1900–1990), musician and bandleader
- Nicholas Eymerich (1316–1399), author of the Directorium Inquisitorum
- Carme García (born 1974), visually impaired para-alpine skier, blind sailor and journalist
- Fidel Roig Matons (1887–1977), Catalan painter and musician
- Miguel Molina (born 1989), racing driver
- Josep Maria Nadal i Farreras (1949–), scholar of Catalan language
- Nachmanides (1194–1270), Jewish rabbi, philosopher, physician, and kabbalist
- Gerard Quintana (1964–), lead singer of Sopa de Cabra
- Jordi Roca (1978–), pastry chef

== Twin towns – sister cities ==
Girona is twinned with:

Reggio Emilia, Italy, since 1982; Albi, France, since 1985; Bluefields, Nicaragua, since 1987; Perpignan, France, since 1988	Farsia, Western Sahara, since 1997; Nueva Girona, Cuba (under negotiation since 1991); Nashville, United States; Wakefield, United Kingdom

- Girona is a member city of Eurotowns network

== See also ==
- La Girona
- List of mayors of Girona
- Sant Feliu Pedestrian Bridge
