= 1999 Spanish local elections in Catalonia =

This article presents the results breakdown of the local elections held in Catalonia on 13 June 1999. The following tables show detailed results in the autonomous community's most populous municipalities, sorted alphabetically.

== City control ==
The following table lists party control in the most populous municipalities, including provincial capitals (highlighted in bold). Gains for a party are highlighted in that party's colour.

Municipality	Population	Previous control	New control
Badalona	209,606	Socialists' Party of Catalonia (PSC–PSOE)	Socialists' Party of Catalonia (PSC–PSOE)
**Barcelona**	1,505,581	Socialists' Party of Catalonia (PSC–PSOE)	Socialists' Party of Catalonia (PSC–PSOE)
Cornellà de Llobregat	80,329	Socialists' Party of Catalonia (PSC–PSOE)	Socialists' Party of Catalonia (PSC–PSOE)
**Girona**	71,858	Socialists' Party of Catalonia (PSC–PSOE)	Socialists' Party of Catalonia (PSC–PSOE)
L'Hospitalet de Llobregat	248,521	Socialists' Party of Catalonia (PSC–PSOE)	Socialists' Party of Catalonia (PSC–PSOE)
**Lleida**	112,207	Socialists' Party of Catalonia (PSC–PSOE)	Socialists' Party of Catalonia (PSC–PSOE)
Mataró	103,265	Socialists' Party of Catalonia (PSC–PSOE)	Socialists' Party of Catalonia (PSC–PSOE)
Reus	89,034	Socialists' Party of Catalonia (PSC–PSOE)	Socialists' Party of Catalonia (PSC–PSOE)
Sabadell	184,859	Agreement for Sabadell–Initiative and Left (EPS–IiE)	Socialists' Party of Catalonia (PSC–PSOE)
Sant Boi de Llobregat	78,632	Socialists' Party of Catalonia (PSC–PSOE)	Socialists' Party of Catalonia (PSC–PSOE)
Sant Cugat del Vallès	50,529	Convergence and Union (CiU)	Convergence and Union (CiU)
Santa Coloma de Gramenet	120,958	Socialists' Party of Catalonia (PSC–PSOE)	Socialists' Party of Catalonia (PSC–PSOE)
**Tarragona**	112,795	Convergence and Union (CiU)	Convergence and Union (CiU)
Terrassa	165,654	Socialists' Party of Catalonia (PSC–PSOE)	Socialists' Party of Catalonia (PSC–PSOE)

== Municipalities ==
=== Badalona ===
Population: 209,606

← Summary of the 13 June 1999 City Council of Badalona election results →
Parties and alliances	Popular vote			Seats	
Parties and alliances	Votes	%	±pp	Total	+/−
Socialists' Party of Catalonia–Municipal Progress (PSC–PM)	34,370	40.98	+8.51	13	+3
Convergence and Union (CiU)	12,917	15.40	−4.47	5	−1
People's Party (PP)	12,822	15.29	−0.52	5	+1
Initiative for Catalonia–Greens–Agreement for Municipal Progress (IC–V–EPM)	9,110	10.86	−14.90	3	−4
United and Alternative Left (EUiA)	4,593	5.48	New	1	+1
Republican Left of Catalonia–Municipal Agreement (ERC–AM)	3,789	4.52	−0.10	0	±0
Progress Socialist Coalition (CSP)	2,639	3.15	New	0	±0
The Greens–Ecologist Confederation of Catalonia (EV–CEC)	1,340	1.60	New	0	±0
Independent Space Place (LLEI)	448	0.53	New	0	±0
Party for Independence (PI)	246	0.29	New	0	±0
Humanist Party of Catalonia (PHC)	86	0.10	New	0	±0
Blank ballots	1,503	1.79	+0.54		
Total	83,863			27	±0
Valid votes	83,863	99.47	−0.27		
Invalid votes	445	0.53	+0.27		
Votes cast / turnout	84,308	47.15	−9.00		
Abstentions	94,512	52.85	+9.00		
Registered voters	178,820				

=== Barcelona ===
Population: 1,505,581

=== Cornellà de Llobregat ===
Population: 80,329

← Summary of the 13 June 1999 City Council of Cornellà de Llobregat election results →
Parties and alliances	Popular vote			Seats	
Parties and alliances	Votes	%	±pp	Total	+/−
Socialists' Party of Catalonia–Municipal Progress (PSC–PM)	19,391	55.90	+4.83	16	+2
People's Party (PP)	4,329	12.48	−0.52	3	±0
Initiative for Catalonia–Greens–Agreement for Municipal Progress (IC–V–EPM)	4,002	11.54	−11.23	3	−3
Convergence and Union (CiU)	2,394	6.90	−1.76	1	−1
Republican Left of Catalonia–Municipal Agreement (ERC–AM)	2,043	5.89	+3.21	1	+1
United and Alternative Left (EUiA)	2,012	5.80	New	1	+1
Blank ballots	515	1.48	+0.44		
Total	34,686			25	±0
Valid votes	34,686	99.47	−0.16		
Invalid votes	185	0.53	+0.16		
Votes cast / turnout	34,871	50.85	−9.92		
Abstentions	33,702	49.15	+9.92		
Registered voters	68,573				

=== Girona ===
Population: 71,858

← Summary of the 13 June 1999 City Council of Girona election results →
Parties and alliances	Popular vote			Seats	
Parties and alliances	Votes	%	±pp	Total	+/−
Socialists' Party of Catalonia–Municipal Progress (PSC–PM)	16,386	47.85	−1.86	14	±0
Convergence and Union (CiU)	7,957	23.24	+2.83	6	+1
People's Party (PP)	3,214	9.39	−2.61	2	−1
Republican Left of Catalonia–Municipal Agreement (ERC–AM)	3,170	9.26	−1.16	2	±0
Initiative for Catalonia–Greens–Agreement for Municipal Progress (IC–V–EPM)	1,833	5.35	−0.94	1	±0
United and Alternative Left (EUiA)	594	1.73	New	0	±0
Party for Independence (PI)	374	1.09	New	0	±0
Humanist Party of Catalonia (PHC)	74	0.22	New	0	±0
Blank ballots	642	1.87	+0.70		
Total	34,244			25	±0
Valid votes	34,244	99.38	−0.10		
Invalid votes	213	0.62	+0.10		
Votes cast / turnout	34,457	58.00	−5.88		
Abstentions	24,947	42.00	+5.88		
Registered voters	59,404				

=== L'Hospitalet de Llobregat ===
Population: 248,521

← Summary of the 13 June 1999 City Council of L'Hospitalet de Llobregat election results →
Parties and alliances	Popular vote			Seats	
Parties and alliances	Votes	%	±pp	Total	+/−
Socialists' Party of Catalonia–Municipal Progress (PSC–PM)	55,876	55.77	+8.00	18	+4
People's Party (PP)	15,343	15.31	−1.83	4	−1
Convergence and Union (CiU)	11,252	11.23	−2.28	3	−1
United and Alternative Left (EUiA)	6,094	6.08	New	1	+1
Initiative for Catalonia–Greens–Agreement for Municipal Progress (IC–V–EPM)	5,363	5.35	−11.32	1	−3
Republican Left of Catalonia–Municipal Agreement (ERC–AM)	2,441	2.44	−0.16	0	±0
The Greens–Green Option (EV–OV)	1,724	1.72	New	0	±0
Party for Independence (PI)	314	0.31	New	0	±0
Humanist Party of Catalonia (PHC)	188	0.19	New	0	±0
Blank ballots	1,593	1.59	+0.41		
Total	100,188			27	±0
Valid votes	100,188	99.38	−0.33		
Invalid votes	628	0.62	+0.33		
Votes cast / turnout	100,816	47.94	−11.48		
Abstentions	109,468	52.06	+11.48		
Registered voters	210,284				

=== Lleida ===
Population: 112,207

← Summary of the 13 June 1999 City Council of Lleida election results →
Parties and alliances	Popular vote			Seats	
Parties and alliances	Votes	%	±pp	Total	+/−
Socialists' Party of Catalonia–Municipal Progress (PSC–PM)	25,434	49.14	+5.25	14	+1
Convergence and Union (CiU)	10,185	19.68	−3.98	6	−1
People's Party (PP)	6,853	13.24	−3.89	4	−1
Republican Left of Catalonia–The Greens–Municipal Agreement (ERC–EV–AM)	3,961	7.65	+2.20	2	+1
Initiative for Catalonia–Greens–Agreement for Municipal Progress (IC–V–EPM)	3,251	6.28	−0.40	1	±0
United and Alternative Left (EUiA)	487	0.94	New	0	±0
Party for Independence (PI)	290	0.56	New	0	±0
Humanist Party of Catalonia (PHC)	78	0.15	New	0	±0
Group of Independents, Progressives and Nationalists (AIPN)	54	0.10	+0.03	0	±0
Blank ballots	1,167	2.25	+1.33		
Total	51,760			27	±0
Valid votes	51,760	99.44	−0.24		
Invalid votes	292	0.56	+0.24		
Votes cast / turnout	52,052	54.51	−5.81		
Abstentions	43,436	45.49	+5.81		
Registered voters	95,488				

=== Mataró ===
Population: 103,265

← Summary of the 13 June 1999 City Council of Mataró election results →
Parties and alliances	Popular vote			Seats	
Parties and alliances	Votes	%	±pp	Total	+/−
Socialists' Party of Catalonia–Municipal Progress (PSC–PM)	21,467	45.19	+8.26	14	+3
Convergence and Union (CiU)	11,528	24.27	−5.34	7	−2
People's Party (PP)	6,713	14.13	−0.57	4	±0
Initiative for Catalonia–Greens–Agreement for Municipal Progress (IC–V–EPM)	3,771	7.94	−3.51	2	−1
Republican Left of Catalonia–Municipal Agreement (ERC–AM)	1,930	4.06	−0.80	0	±0
United and Alternative Left (EUiA)	1,087	2.29	New	0	±0
Party for Independence (PI)	255	0.54	New	0	±0
Blank ballots	755	1.59	+0.60		
Total	47,506			27	±0
Valid votes	47,506	99.56	−0.19		
Invalid votes	208	0.44	+0.19		
Votes cast / turnout	47,714	56.97	−8.28		
Abstentions	36,036	43.03	+8.28		
Registered voters	83,750				

=== Reus ===
Population: 89,034

← Summary of the 13 June 1999 City Council of Reus election results →
Parties and alliances	Popular vote			Seats	
Parties and alliances	Votes	%	±pp	Total	+/−
Socialists' Party of Catalonia–Municipal Progress (PSC–PM)	13,298	36.60	+0.16	10	±0
Convergence and Union (CiU)	8,293	22.82	−5.66	6	−1
People's Party (PP)	4,971	13.68	−0.74	4	±0
Republican Left of Catalonia–Municipal Agreement (ERC–AM)	3,723	10.25	+1.50	3	+1
Initiative for Catalonia–Greens–Agreement for Municipal Progress (IC–V–EPM)	2,945	8.11	−1.17	2	±0
United and Alternative Left (EUiA)	1,125	3.10	New	0	±0
The Alternative of Reus–Federation of Independents of Catalonia (L'AR–FIC)	1,011	2.78	New	0	±0
Party for Independence (PI)	235	0.65	New	0	±0
Blank ballots	734	2.02	+0.79		
Total	36,335			25	±0
Valid votes	36,335	99.30	−0.37		
Invalid votes	257	0.70	+0.37		
Votes cast / turnout	36,592	50.88	−7.36		
Abstentions	35,330	49.12	+7.36		
Registered voters	71,922				

=== Sabadell ===
Population: 184,859

← Summary of the 13 June 1999 City Council of Sabadell election results →
Parties and alliances	Popular vote			Seats	
Parties and alliances	Votes	%	±pp	Total	+/−
Socialists' Party of Catalonia–Municipal Progress (PSC–PM)	26,369	33.47	+15.59	10	+5
Agreement for Sabadell–Initiative and Left–EPM (EPS–IiE–EPM)	26,270	33.35	−17.73	10	−5
Convergence and Union (CiU)	12,506	15.88	−0.05	4	±0
People's Party (PP)	7,674	9.74	+0.07	2	−1
Republican Left of Catalonia–Municipal Agreement (ERC–AM)	4,016	5.10	+1.53	1	+1
Party for Independence (PI)	373	0.47	New	0	±0
Humanist Party of Catalonia (PHC)	236	0.30	New	0	±0
Blank ballots	1,333	1.69	+0.85		
Total	78,777			27	±0
Valid votes	78,777	99.48	−0.23		
Invalid votes	412	0.52	+0.23		
Votes cast / turnout	79,189	51.55	−7.40		
Abstentions	74,430	48.45	+7.40		
Registered voters	153,619				

=== Sant Boi de Llobregat ===
Population: 78,632

← Summary of the 13 June 1999 City Council of Sant Boi de Llobregat election results →
Parties and alliances	Popular vote			Seats	
Parties and alliances	Votes	%	±pp	Total	+/−
Socialists' Party of Catalonia–Municipal Progress (PSC–PM)	16,605	53.53	+14.36	15	+5
Initiative–Greens–Agreement for Municipal Progress (IC–V–EPM)	5,184	16.71	−8.76	4	−3
People's Party (PP)	3,582	11.55	−1.19	3	±0
Convergence and Union (CiU)	3,244	10.46	−7.55	3	−2
Republican Left of Catalonia–Municipal Agreement (ERC–AM)	1,124	3.62	+0.19	0	±0
United and Alternative Left (EUiA)	796	2.57	New	0	±0
Blank ballots	485	1.55	+0.38		
Total	31,020			25	±0
Valid votes	31,020	99.30	−0.44		
Invalid votes	220	0.70	+0.44		
Votes cast / turnout	31,240	47.19	−10.45		
Abstentions	34,965	52.81	+10.45		
Registered voters	66,205				

=== Sant Cugat del Vallès ===
Population: 50,529

← Summary of the 13 June 1999 City Council of Sant Cugat del Vallès election results →
Parties and alliances	Popular vote			Seats	
Parties and alliances	Votes	%	±pp	Total	+/−
Convergence and Union (CiU)	7,530	31.83	−7.53	9	−1
Socialists' Party of Catalonia–Municipal Progress (PSC–PM)	6,840	28.91	+6.68	8	+3
People's Party (PP)	3,310	13.99	−0.02	4	+1
Initiative–Greens–Agreement for Municipal Progress (IC–V–EPM)	2,258	9.54	−1.33	2	±0
Republican Left of Catalonia–Municipal Agreement (ERC–AM)	1,943	8.21	+0.85	2	+1
United and Alternative Left (EUiA)	671	2.84	New	0	±0
Union of Independents of Sant Cugat (UNIS)	282	1.19	−3.17	0	±0
Party for Independence (PI)	188	0.79	New	0	±0
Blank ballots	637	2.69	+0.88		
Total	23,659			25	+4
Valid votes	23,659	99.57	−0.02		
Invalid votes	101	0.43	+0.02		
Votes cast / turnout	23,760	54.44	−8.77		
Abstentions	19,887	45.56	+8.77		
Registered voters	43,647				

=== Santa Coloma de Gramenet ===
Population: 120,958

← Summary of the 13 June 1999 City Council of Santa Coloma de Gramenet election results →
Parties and alliances	Popular vote			Seats	
Parties and alliances	Votes	%	±pp	Total	+/−
Socialists' Party of Catalonia–Municipal Progress (PSC–PM)	28,324	58.34	+15.45	18	+6
Initiative for Catalonia–Greens–Agreement for Municipal Progress (IC–V–EPM)	7,608	15.67	−25.61	4	−8
People's Party (PP)	4,845	9.98	+2.87	3	+1
Convergence and Union (CiU)	3,763	7.75	+1.49	2	+1
United and Alternative Left and the Greens (EUiA–EV)	2,305	4.75	New	0	±0
Republican Left of Catalonia–Municipal Agreement (ERC–AM)	762	1.57	+0.70	0	±0
Humanist Party of Catalonia (PHC)	116	0.24	New	0	±0
Blank ballots	830	1.71	+0.88		
Total	48,553			27	±0
Valid votes	48,553	99.59	−0.19		
Invalid votes	202	0.41	+0.19		
Votes cast / turnout	48,755	48.28	−14.33		
Abstentions	52,231	51.72	+14.33		
Registered voters	100,986				

=== Tarragona ===
Population: 112,795

← Summary of the 13 June 1999 City Council of Tarragona election results →
Parties and alliances	Popular vote			Seats	
Parties and alliances	Votes	%	±pp	Total	+/−
Convergence and Union (CiU)	18,682	36.54	−7.85	11	−2
Socialists' Party of Catalonia–Municipal Progress (PSC–PM)	14,505	28.37	+3.19	8	+1
People's Party (PP)	8,475	16.58	+0.09	5	±0
Initiative–Greens–Platform–Agreement for Municipal Progress (IC–V–PL–EPM)	3,682	7.20	−1.41	2	±0
Republican Left of Catalonia–The Greens–Municipal Agreement (ERC–EV–AM)	2,609	5.10	+0.80	1	+1
United and Alternative Left (EUiA)	1,961	3.84	New	0	±0
Party for Independence (PI)	144	0.28	New	0	±0
Humanist Party of Catalonia (PHC)	107	0.21	New	0	±0
Blank ballots	965	1.89	+0.86		
Total	51,130			27	±0
Valid votes	51,130	99.50	−0.15		
Invalid votes	255	0.50	+0.15		
Votes cast / turnout	51,385	55.92	−7.37		
Abstentions	40,511	44.08	+7.37		
Registered voters	91,896				

=== Terrassa ===
Population: 165,654

← Summary of the 13 June 1999 City Council of Terrassa election results →
Parties and alliances	Popular vote			Seats	
Parties and alliances	Votes	%	±pp	Total	+/−
Socialists' Party of Catalonia–Municipal Progress (PSC–PM)	34,323	50.41	+6.88	16	+3
Convergence and Union (CiU)	11,556	16.97	−5.11	5	−1
People's Party (PP)	7,938	11.66	−1.86	3	−1
Initiative for Catalonia–Greens–Agreement for Municipal Progress (IC–V–EPM)	5,002	7.35	−5.02	2	−1
Republican Left of Catalonia–Municipal Agreement (ERC–AM)	3,851	5.66	−0.40	1	±0
The Greens–Ecologist Confederation of Catalonia (EV–CEC)	2,019	2.97	New	0	±0
United and Alternative Left (EUiA)	1,840	2.70	New	0	±0
Party for Independence (PI)	181	0.27	New	0	±0
Humanist Party of Catalonia (PHC)	84	0.12	New	0	±0
Blank ballots	1,300	1.91	+0.01		
Total	68,094			27	±0
Valid votes	68,094	99.56	+0.07		
Invalid votes	300	0.44	−0.07		
Votes cast / turnout	68,394	49.18	−10.39		
Abstentions	70,680	50.82	+10.39		
Registered voters	139,074				

== See also ==
- 1999 Catalan regional election
