= 2011 Spanish local elections in Catalonia =

This article presents the results breakdown of the local elections held in Catalonia on 22 May 2011. The following tables show detailed results in the autonomous community's most populous municipalities, sorted alphabetically.

== City control ==
The following table lists party control in the most populous municipalities, including provincial capitals (shown in bold). Gains for a party are displayed with the cell's background shaded in that party's colour.

Municipality	Population	Previous control	New control
Badalona	218,886	Socialists' Party of Catalonia (PSC–PSOE)	People's Party (PP)
**Barcelona**	1,619,337	Socialists' Party of Catalonia (PSC–PSOE)	Convergence and Union (CiU)
Cornellà de Llobregat	87,240	Socialists' Party of Catalonia (PSC–PSOE)	Socialists' Party of Catalonia (PSC–PSOE)
**Girona**	96,236	Socialists' Party of Catalonia (PSC–PSOE)	Convergence and Union (CiU)
L'Hospitalet de Llobregat	258,642	Socialists' Party of Catalonia (PSC–PSOE)	Socialists' Party of Catalonia (PSC–PSOE)
**Lleida**	137,387	Socialists' Party of Catalonia (PSC–PSOE)	Socialists' Party of Catalonia (PSC–PSOE)
Manresa	76,209	Socialists' Party of Catalonia (PSC–PSOE)	Convergence and Union (CiU)
Mataró	122,905	Socialists' Party of Catalonia (PSC–PSOE)	Convergence and Union (CiU)
Reus	106,622	Socialists' Party of Catalonia (PSC–PSOE)	Convergence and Union (CiU)
Sabadell	207,338	Socialists' Party of Catalonia (PSC–PSOE)	Socialists' Party of Catalonia (PSC–PSOE)
Sant Boi de Llobregat	82,411	Socialists' Party of Catalonia (PSC–PSOE)	Socialists' Party of Catalonia (PSC–PSOE)
Sant Cugat del Vallès	81,745	Convergence and Union (CiU)	Convergence and Union (CiU)
Santa Coloma de Gramenet	120,060	Socialists' Party of Catalonia (PSC–PSOE)	Socialists' Party of Catalonia (PSC–PSOE)
**Tarragona**	134,933	Socialists' Party of Catalonia (PSC–PSOE)	Socialists' Party of Catalonia (PSC–PSOE)
Terrassa	212,724	Socialists' Party of Catalonia (PSC–PSOE)	Socialists' Party of Catalonia (PSC–PSOE)

== Municipalities ==
=== Badalona ===
Population: 218,886

← Summary of the 22 May 2011 City Council of Badalona election results →
Parties and alliances	Popular vote			Seats	
Parties and alliances	Votes	%	±pp	Total	+/−
People's Party (PP)	26,920	33.48	+11.62	11	+4
Socialists' Party of Catalonia–Municipal Progress (PSC–PM)	21,750	27.05	−1.76	9	±0
Convergence and Union (CiU)	10,090	12.55	−3.91	4	−1
Initiative for Catalonia Greens–EUiA–Agreement (ICV–EUiA–E)	7,156	8.90	−5.88	3	−2
Republican Left of Catalonia–Accent–Rally (esquerra–Accent–RI.cat)	2,973	3.70	−2.07	0	−1
Popular Unity Candidacy–Active People (CUP–PA)^{1}	1,465	1.82	−0.29	0	±0
The Greens–European Green Group (EV–GVE)	1,378	1.71	New	0	±0
Platform for Catalonia (PxC)	1,334	1.66	New	0	±0
Blank Seats–Citizens for Blank Votes (EB–CenB)	951	1.18	+0.74	0	±0
Citizens–Party of the Citizenry (C's)	942	1.17	−2.99	0	±0
Catalan Solidarity for Independence (SI)	762	0.95	New	0	±0
Socialist Party of Badalona (PSBad)	617	0.77	New	0	±0
Critical Socialists and Democrats (SiDC)	285	0.35	New	0	±0
Independent Space Place (LLEI)	254	0.32	−0.44	0	±0
Participatory Democracy (Participa)	172	0.21	New	0	±0
Left Republican Party–Republican Left (PRE–IR)	115	0.14	New	0	±0
Internationalist Socialist Workers' Party (POSI)	106	0.13	New	0	±0
Family and Life Party (PFiV)	98	0.12	New	0	±0
Blank ballots	3,036	3.78	+0.67		
Total	80,404			27	±0
Valid votes	80,404	98.89	−0.71		
Invalid votes	900	1.11	+0.71		
Votes cast / turnout	81,304	52.11	+6.09		
Abstentions	74,714	47.89	−6.09		
Registered voters	156,018				
Sources
Footnotes: ^{1} Popular Unity Candidacy–Active People results are compared to The Greens–Popular Unity Candidacy totals in the 2007 election.

=== Barcelona ===
Population: 1,619,337

=== Cornellà de Llobregat ===
Population: 87,240

← Summary of the 22 May 2011 City Council of Cornellà de Llobregat election results →
Parties and alliances	Popular vote			Seats	
Parties and alliances	Votes	%	±pp	Total	+/−
Socialists' Party of Catalonia–Municipal Progress (PSC–PM)	12,633	42.08	−14.55	14	−2
People's Party (PP)	4,787	15.95	+3.76	5	+2
Initiative for Catalonia Greens–EUiA–Agreement (ICV–EUiA–E)	3,566	11.88	+0.41	4	+1
Convergence and Union (CiU)	2,667	8.88	+1.84	2	±0
Platform for Catalonia (PxC)	1,486	4.95	New	0	±0
Republican Left of Catalonia–Municipal Agreement (ERC–AM)	1,347	4.49	−1.30	0	−1
Citizens–Party of the Citizenry (C's)	782	2.61	−1.93	0	±0
From Below (Des de Baix)	692	2.31	New	0	±0
Democratic Way (VD)	586	1.95	New	0	±0
Movement for Socialism (MxS)	81	0.27	New	0	±0
Blank ballots	1,392	4.64	+2.31		
Total	30,019			25	±0
Valid votes	30,019	98.40	−1.09		
Invalid votes	488	1.60	+1.09		
Votes cast / turnout	30,507	50.47	−0.32		
Abstentions	29,935	49.53	+0.32		
Registered voters	60,442				

=== Girona ===
Population: 96,236

← Summary of the 22 May 2011 City Council of Girona election results →
Parties and alliances	Popular vote			Seats	
Parties and alliances	Votes	%	±pp	Total	+/−
Convergence and Union (CiU)	10,123	31.51	+9.57	10	+4
Socialists' Party of Catalonia–Municipal Progress (PSC–PM)	7,505	23.36	−11.44	7	−3
People's Party (PP)	3,750	11.67	+2.75	3	+1
Popular Unity Candidacy–Active People (CUP–PA)	2,981	9.28	+6.45	3	+3
Initiative for Catalonia Greens–EUiA–Agreement (ICV–EUiA–E)	2,256	7.02	−3.81	2	−1
Republican Left of Catalonia–Municipal Agreement (ERC–AM)	1,604	4.99	−7.87	0	−4
Catalan Solidarity for Independence (SI)	786	2.45	New	0	±0
Blank Seats–Citizens for Blank Votes (EB–CenB)	417	1.30	New	0	±0
Citizens–Party of the Citizenry (C's)	403	1.25	−1.02	0	±0
The Greens–European Green Group (EV–GVE)	272	0.85	New	0	±0
Anti-Bullfighting Party Against Mistreatment of Animals (PACMA)	217	0.68	New	0	±0
From Below (Des de Baix)	187	0.58	New	0	±0
We Fight with You (LaT)	92	0.29	New	0	±0
Left Republican Party–Republican Left (PRE–IR)	58	0.18	New	0	±0
Union, Progress and Democracy (UPyD)	58	0.18	New	0	±0
Blank ballots	1,418	4.41	+0.24		
Total	32,127			25	±0
Valid votes	32,127	98.21	−1.05		
Invalid votes	585	1.79	+1.05		
Votes cast / turnout	32,712	51.70	+0.41		
Abstentions	30,566	48.30	−0.41		
Registered voters	63,278				

=== L'Hospitalet de Llobregat ===
Population: 258,642

← Summary of the 22 May 2011 City Council of L'Hospitalet de Llobregat election results →
Parties and alliances	Popular vote			Seats	
Parties and alliances	Votes	%	±pp	Total	+/−
Socialists' Party of Catalonia–Municipal Progress (PSC–PM)	32,954	38.85	−13.91	13	−4
People's Party (PP)	15,755	18.57	+3.69	6	+1
Convergence and Union (CiU)	10,431	12.30	+2.03	4	+1
Initiative for Catalonia Greens–EUiA–Agreement (ICV–EUiA–E)	7,554	8.91	−0.01	2	±0
Platform for Catalonia (PxC)	6,207	7.32	New	2	+2
Republican Left of Catalonia–Municipal Agreement (ERC–AM)	2,266	2.67	−2.10	0	±0
Citizens–Party of the Citizenry (C's)	1,807	2.13	−1.63	0	±0
The Greens–European Green Group (EV–GVE)	1,327	1.56	New	0	±0
Blank Seats–Citizens for Blank Votes (EB–CenB)	978	1.15	+0.88	0	±0
Pirates of Catalonia (Pirata.cat)	840	0.99	New	0	±0
Popular Unity Candidacy–Active People (CUP–PA)	540	0.64	New	0	±0
United for L'Hospitalet Solidarity–Rally (U per L'H)	411	0.48	New	0	±0
Communist Unification of Spain (UCE)	182	0.21	New	0	±0
Catalan Identity (IdCat)	154	0.18	New	0	±0
Blank ballots	3,416	4.03	+1.75		
Total	84,822			27	±0
Valid votes	84,822	98.54	−1.12		
Invalid votes	1,253	1.46	+1.12		
Votes cast / turnout	86,075	50.24	+3.55		
Abstentions	85,237	49.76	−3.55		
Registered voters	171,312				

=== Lleida ===
Population: 137,387

← Summary of the 22 May 2011 City Council of Lleida election results →
Parties and alliances	Popular vote			Seats	
Parties and alliances	Votes	%	±pp	Total	+/−
Socialists' Party of Catalonia–Municipal Progress (PSC–PM)	18,864	42.06	−4.17	15	±0
Convergence and Union (CiU)	8,212	18.31	−1.73	6	±0
People's Party (PP)	7,410	16.52	+4.66	6	+3
Initiative for Catalonia Greens–EUiA–Agreement (ICV–EUiA–E)	2,080	4.64	−1.07	0	−1
Republican Left of Catalonia–Municipal Agreement (ERC–AM)	1,890	4.21	−2.75	0	−2
Popular Unity Candidacy (CUP)	1,464	3.26	+1.11	0	±0
Platform for Catalonia (PxC)	1,122	2.50	+2.37	0	±0
Citizens–Party of the Citizenry (C's)	433	0.97	−1.08	0	±0
Blank Seats–Citizens for Blank Votes (EB–CenB)	387	0.86	New	0	±0
Pirates of Catalonia (Pirata.cat)	360	0.80	New	0	±0
Anti-Bullfighting Party Against Mistreatment of Animals (PACMA)	217	0.48	New	0	±0
Party for Catalonia (PxCat)	191	0.43	New	0	±0
Working Lleida (LT)	126	0.28	+0.04	0	±0
Union, Progress and Democracy (UPyD)	81	0.18	New	0	±0
Family and Life Party (PFiV)	66	0.15	−0.11	0	±0
Blank ballots	1,943	4.33	+1.55		
Total	44,846			27	±0
Valid votes	44,846	98.42	−1.08		
Invalid votes	719	1.58	+1.08		
Votes cast / turnout	45,565	49.81	−1.99		
Abstentions	45,906	50.19	+1.99		
Registered voters	91,471				

=== Manresa ===
Population: 76,209

← Summary of the 22 May 2011 City Council of Manresa election results →
Parties and alliances	Popular vote			Seats	
Parties and alliances	Votes	%	±pp	Total	+/−
Convergence and Union (CiU)	9,356	35.01	+6.09	11	+3
Socialists' Party of Catalonia–Municipal Progress (PSC–PM)	3,339	12.49	−14.12	4	−4
Republican Left of Catalonia–Municipal Agreement (ERC–AM)	3,089	11.56	−0.34	3	±0
People's Party (PP)	2,498	9.35	+2.43	3	+1
Platform for Catalonia (PxC)	2,391	8.95	+3.14	2	+1
Popular Unity Candidacy–Active People (CUP–PA)	1,981	7.41	+1.41	2	+1
Initiative for Catalonia Greens–EUiA–Agreement (ICV–EUiA–E)	1,157	4.33	−3.77	0	−2
Manresan Neighbourhood Movement (MoVeM)	770	2.88	New	0	±0
Manresan People (MNRS)	569	2.13	New	0	±0
Catalan Solidarity for Independence (SI)	544	2.04	New	0	±0
Blank ballots	1,030	3.81	−0.13		
Total	26,724			25	±0
Valid votes	26,724	98.80	−0.65		
Invalid votes	325	1.20	+0.65		
Votes cast / turnout	27,049	51.31	+2.26		
Abstentions	25,664	48.69	−2.26		
Registered voters	52,713				

=== Mataró ===
Population: 122,905

← Summary of the 22 May 2011 City Council of Mataró election results →
Parties and alliances	Popular vote			Seats	
Parties and alliances	Votes	%	±pp	Total	+/−
Convergence and Union (CiU)	11,122	24.76	+3.77	8	+1
Socialists' Party of Catalonia–Municipal Progress (PSC–PM)	10,019	22.31	−12.18	8	−3
People's Party (PP)	6,886	15.33	+1.14	5	+1
Platform for Catalonia (PxC)	4,686	10.43	+10.09	3	+3
Initiative for Catalonia Greens–EUiA–Agreement (ICV–EUiA–E)	3,033	6.75	+0.32	2	±0
Popular Unity Candidacy–Active People (CUP–PA)	2,498	5.56	+0.03	1	±0
ERC–Rally–Together We Decide–Municipal Agreement (ERC–RI.cat–Junts–AM)	1,768	3.94	−2.19	0	−2
Left Mataró (ME)	708	1.58	New	0	±0
The Greens–European Green Group (EV–GVE)	655	1.46	New	0	±0
Pirates of Catalonia (Pirata.cat)	530	1.18	New	0	±0
Catalan Solidarity for Independence (SI)	428	0.95	New	0	±0
Mataronese People–Alliance for a New Mataró (M'ns)	383	0.85	New	0	±0
Communist Unification of Spain (UCE)	55	0.12	New	0	±0
Blank ballots	2,142	4.77	+1.61		
Total	44,913			27	±0
Valid votes	44,913	99.02	−0.66		
Invalid votes	444	0.98	+0.66		
Votes cast / turnout	45,357	53.21	+6.99		
Abstentions	39,880	46.79	−6.99		
Registered voters	85,237				

=== Reus ===
Population: 106,622

← Summary of the 22 May 2011 City Council of Reus election results →
Parties and alliances	Popular vote			Seats	
Parties and alliances	Votes	%	±pp	Total	+/−
Convergence and Union (CiU)	10,489	27.79	+2.66	10	+2
Socialists' Party of Catalonia–Municipal Progress (PSC–PM)	8,059	21.35	−12.01	8	−2
People's Party (PP)	6,186	16.39	+3.41	6	+2
Reus Now (AReus)	1,980	5.25	New	2	+2
Popular Unity Candidacy–Active People (CUP–PA)	1,931	5.12	New	1	+1
Reus Independent Coordinator (CORI)	1,885	4.99	−0.06	0	−1
Platform for Catalonia (PxC)	1,830	4.85	New	0	±0
Republican Left of Catalonia–Municipal Agreement (ERC–AM)	1,571	4.16	−3.71	0	−2
Initiative for Catalonia Greens–EUiA–Agreement (ICV–EUiA–E)	1,536	4.07	−2.78	0	−2
Citizens–Party of the Citizenry (C's)	577	1.53	−1.67	0	±0
Catalan Solidarity for Independence (SI)	543	1.44	New	0	±0
Blank ballots	1,162	3.08	+0.36		
Total	37,749			27	±0
Valid votes	37,749	98.89	−0.64		
Invalid votes	425	1.11	+0.64		
Votes cast / turnout	38,174	53.90	+3.98		
Abstentions	32,644	46.10	−3.98		
Registered voters	70,818				

=== Sabadell ===
Population: 207,338

← Summary of the 22 May 2011 City Council of Sabadell election results →
Parties and alliances	Popular vote			Seats	
Parties and alliances	Votes	%	±pp	Total	+/−
Socialists' Party of Catalonia–Municipal Progress (PSC–PM)	28,623	38.32	−2.76	13	±0
Convergence and Union (CiU)	12,635	16.92	+1.83	5	±0
Initiative for Catalonia Greens–EUiA–Agreement (ICV–EUiA–E)	8,571	11.48	−1.56	4	±0
People's Party (PP)	7,674	10.27	+2.00	3	+1
Agreement for Sabadell–Vallès Alternative Candidacies (ES–CAV)	5,347	7.16	−0.99	2	±0
Republican Left of Catalonia+Rally–Municipal Agreement (esquerra+RI.cat–AM)	2,378	3.18	−2.63	0	−1
Popular Unity Candidacy–Active People (CUP–PA)	2,290	3.07	New	0	±0
Citizens–Party of the Citizenry (C's)	1,268	1.70	−1.13	0	±0
Platform for Catalonia (PxC)	1,181	1.58	New	0	±0
Anti-Bullfighting Party Against Mistreatment of Animals (PACMA)	1,062	1.42	New	0	±0
Catalan Solidarity for Independence (SI)	623	0.83	New	0	±0
Blank ballots	3,036	4.06	+1.21		
Total	74,688			27	±0
Valid votes	74,688	98.81	−0.78		
Invalid votes	898	1.19	+0.78		
Votes cast / turnout	75,586	50.22	+2.20		
Abstentions	74,938	49.78	−2.20		
Registered voters	150,524				

=== Sant Boi de Llobregat ===
Population: 82,411

← Summary of the 22 May 2011 City Council of Sant Boi de Llobregat election results →
Parties and alliances	Popular vote			Seats	
Parties and alliances	Votes	%	±pp	Total	+/−
Socialists' Party of Catalonia–Municipal Progress (PSC–PM)	8,751	30.62	−14.14	10	−3
People's Party (PP)	4,933	17.26	+3.76	5	+2
Initiative for Catalonia Greens–EUiA–Agreement (ICV–EUiA–E)	3,617	12.66	−1.05	4	+1
Convergence and Union (CiU)	3,359	11.76	+0.16	3	±0
Platform for Catalonia (PxC)	2,991	10.47	New	3	+3
Republican Left of Catalonia–Municipal Agreement (ERC–AM)	1,083	3.79	−4.59	0	−2
Citizens–Party of the Citizenry (C's)	954	3.34	−1.90	0	−1
Popular Unity Candidacy–Active People (CUP–PA)	751	2.63	New	0	±0
Catalan Solidarity for Independence (SI)	340	1.19	New	0	±0
Union, Progress and Democracy (UPyD)	312	1.09	New	0	±0
Blank ballots	1,484	5.10	+2.30		
Total	28,575			25	±0
Valid votes	28,575	98.23	−1.34		
Invalid votes	516	1.77	+1.34		
Votes cast / turnout	29,091	47.50	+2.31		
Abstentions	32,153	52.50	−2.31		
Registered voters	61,244				

=== Sant Cugat del Vallès ===
Population: 81,745

← Summary of the 22 May 2011 City Council of Sant Cugat del Vallès election results →
Parties and alliances	Popular vote			Seats	
Parties and alliances	Votes	%	±pp	Total	+/−
Convergence and Union (CiU)	13,954	46.11	+0.83	15	+1
People's Party (PP)	3,795	12.54	+3.65	4	+2
Socialists' Party of Catalonia–Municipal Progress (PSC–PM)	2,773	9.16	−5.62	2	−2
Initiative for Catalonia Greens–EUiA–Agreement (ICV–EUiA–E)	2,575	8.51	−3.14	2	−1
Popular Unity Candidacy–Active People (CUP–PA)	2,346	7.75	+4.73	2	+2
Republican Left of Catalonia–Rally–Municipal Agreement (esquerra–RI.cat–AM)	1,474	4.87	−3.15	0	−2
Citizens–Party of the Citizenry (C's)	681	2.25	−2.03	0	±0
Another Sant Cugat–Citizen Platform for Sant Cugat (UASC)	597	1.97	New	0	±0
Catalan Solidarity for Independence (SI)	464	1.53	New	0	±0
Family and Life Party (PFiV)	161	0.53	New	0	±0
Blank ballots	1,444	4.77	+1.78		
Total	30,264			25	±0
Valid votes	30,264	98.47	−1.21		
Invalid votes	469	1.53	+1.21		
Votes cast / turnout	30,733	55.49	+4.21		
Abstentions	24,653	44.51	−4.21		
Registered voters	55,386				

=== Santa Coloma de Gramenet ===
Population: 120,060

← Summary of the 22 May 2011 City Council of Santa Coloma de Gramenet election results →
Parties and alliances	Popular vote			Seats	
Parties and alliances	Votes	%	±pp	Total	+/−
Socialists' Party of Catalonia–Municipal Progress (PSC–PM)	15,183	39.17	−14.66	12	−5
People's Party (PP)	6,661	17.19	+4.86	5	+1
Initiative for Catalonia Greens–EUiA–Agreement (ICV–EUiA–E)	4,627	11.94	−0.21	3	−1
Platform for Catalonia (PxC)	3,519	9.08	New	3	+3
People of Gramenet (GG)	2,575	6.64	+1.66	2	+2
Convergence and Union (CiU)	2,550	6.58	+0.44	2	±0
Citizens–Party of the Citizenry (C's)	771	1.99	−1.89	0	±0
Republican Left–Independence Rally–Municipal Agreement (ERC–RI.cat–AM)	602	1.55	−2.04	0	±0
Blank Seats–Citizens for Blank Votes (EB–CenB)	457	1.18	+0.96	0	±0
Communist Party of the Catalan People (PCPC)	340	0.88	+0.20	0	±0
Blank ballots	1,472	3.80	+1.85		
Total	38,757			27	±0
Valid votes	38,757	98.74	−0.96		
Invalid votes	496	1.26	+0.96		
Votes cast / turnout	39,253	49.68	+4.08		
Abstentions	39,756	50.32	−4.08		
Registered voters	79,009				

=== Tarragona ===
Population: 134,933

← Summary of the 22 May 2011 City Council of Tarragona election results →
Parties and alliances	Popular vote			Seats	
Parties and alliances	Votes	%	±pp	Total	+/−
Socialists' Party of Catalonia–Municipal Progress (PSC–PM)	17,826	36.94	−2.82	12	−1
Convergence and Union (CiU)	9,920	20.55	−2.52	7	−1
People's Party (PP)	9,917	20.55	+6.93	7	+3
Initiative for Catalonia Greens–EUiA–Agreement (ICV–EUiA–E)	2,602	5.39	+0.63	1	+1
Republican Left of Catalonia–Municipal Agreement (ERC–AM)	1,914	3.97	−3.72	0	−2
Popular Unity Candidacy–Active People (CUP–PA)	1,099	2.28	New	0	±0
Catalan Solidarity for Independence (SI)	847	1.76	New	0	±0
Citizens–Party of the Citizenry (C's)	827	1.71	−2.03	0	±0
Blank Seats–Citizens for Blank Votes (EB–CenB)	523	1.08	+0.76	0	±0
Platform for Catalonia (PxC)	371	0.77	New	0	±0
Anti-Bullfighting Party Against Mistreatment of Animals (PACMA)	295	0.61	New	0	±0
Union, Progress and Democracy (UPyD)	180	0.37	New	0	±0
Engine and Sports Alternative (AMD)	102	0.21	New	0	±0
Family and Life Party (PFiV)	83	0.17	+0.05	0	±0
Spanish Phalanx of the CNSO (FE de las JONS)	60	0.12	New	0	±0
Blank ballots	1,696	3.51	+1.66		
Total	48,262			27	±0
Valid votes	48,262	98.71	−0.86		
Invalid votes	633	1.29	+0.86		
Votes cast / turnout	48,895	54.22	+1.16		
Abstentions	41,282	45.78	−1.16		
Registered voters	90,177				

=== Terrassa ===
Population: 212,724

← Summary of the 22 May 2011 City Council of Terrassa election results →
Parties and alliances	Popular vote			Seats	
Parties and alliances	Votes	%	±pp	Total	+/−
Socialists' Party of Catalonia–Municipal Progress (PSC–PM)	23,056	32.32	−11.25	11	−2
Convergence and Union (CiU)	17,442	24.45	+4.61	9	+3
People's Party (PP)	8,736	12.25	+2.41	4	+1
Initiative for Catalonia Greens–EUiA–Agreement (ICV–EUiA–E)	6,597	9.25	−1.00	3	±0
Republican Left of Catalonia–Rally–Municipal Agreement (esquerra–RI.cat–AM)	3,165	4.44	−2.97	0	−2
Platform for Catalonia (PxC)	2,104	2.95	New	0	±0
Citizens–Party of the Citizenry (C's)	1,504	2.11	−1.76	0	±0
Blank Seats–Citizens for Blank Votes (EB–CenB)	1,216	1.70	New	0	±0
Catalan Solidarity for Independence (SI)	971	1.36	New	0	±0
Popular Unity Candidacy–Active People (CUP–PA)	871	1.22	−0.07	0	±0
Democratic Way (VD)	565	0.79	New	0	±0
Advance Terrassa Party (PAT)	530	0.74	New	0	±0
Party for Catalonia (PxCat)	492	0.69	New	0	±0
Centre Union for Terrassa (UCTerrassa)	387	0.54	New	0	±0
Family and Life Party (PFiV)	191	0.27	−0.22	0	±0
Spanish Phalanx of the CNSO (FE de las JONS)	114	0.16	New	0	±0
Communist Unification of Spain (UCE)	110	0.15	New	0	±0
Blank ballots	3,284	4.60	+1.45		
Total	71,335			27	±0
Valid votes	71,335	98.60	−0.94		
Invalid votes	1,014	1.40	+0.94		
Votes cast / turnout	72,349	48.50	+4.21		
Abstentions	76,831	51.50	−4.21		
Registered voters	149,180				
