= Confederation of the Greens =

Confederation of the Greens Confederación de los Verdes
- Leader: Joan Oms
- Founded: 23 September 1984
- Headquarters: C/ Imagen 6-4º Sevilla
- Ideology: Green politics
- National affiliation: Green List (1989); Plural Left (2011–2015)
- European affiliation: European Green Party (2004–2012)
- International affiliation: Global Greens
- Colours: Green

Website
- www.verdes.es

The Confederation of the Greens (Spanish: Confederación de los Verdes), frequently referred to as simply The Greens (Spanish: Los Verdes, LV), is a green political party in Spain. Since 2011, 13 out of 16 of their member parties belong to Equo; for this reason, on 13 May 2012, the European Green Party decided to withdraw the Confederation of the Greens membership.

== Composition ==
Party
The Greens of the Valencian Country (EVPV)
The Greens–Green Option (EV–OV)
Tour Madrid–The Greens (GM–LV)

== Electoral performance ==
=== Cortes Generales ===
Cortes Generales
Election	Congress					Senate		Leading candidate	Status in legislature
Election	Votes	%	#	Seats	+/–	Seats	+/–	Leading candidate	Status in legislature
1986	31,909	0.2%	22nd	0 / 350	0	0 / 208	0	—	No seats
1989	Within LV–LV			0 / 350	0	0 / 208	0	Humberto da Cruz	No seats
1993	185,940	0.8%	10th	0 / 350	0	0 / 208	0	Francisco Garrido	No seats
1996	61,698	0.3%	13th	0 / 350	0	0 / 208	0	Ana Segura	No seats
2000	70,906	0.3%	14th	0 / 350	0	0 / 208	0	Vicenta Rico	No seats
2004	Within PSOE (Note: The party also ran several independent lists in Asturias, Extremadura and Murcia, totalling 15,220 votes (0.1%) and 0 seats.)			1 / 350	1	0 / 208	0	Francisco Garrido	Confidence and supply
2008	49,355	0.2%	13th	0 / 350	1	0 / 208	0	Joan Oms	No seats

== See also ==
- Green party
- Green politics
- List of environmental organizations
