= Another Democracy is Possible =

Another Democracy is Possible Spanish: Otra Democracia es Posible
- Formation: 2003
- Dissolved: 2006
- Website: http://otradem.net/

Another Democracy is Possible (Spanish: Otra Democracia es Posible) was a Spanish activist group (2003~2006), advocating for more democracy (fair electoral systems, participative and direct democracy, popular initiatives, and so on).

It carried out several Trojan activities; for instance, it took part of national, regional and local polls as an extraparliamentary Spanish political party. It never asked for votes; rather, it promoted its activist message by including its shocking logo into the electoral ballots and getting media visibility.
