= The Greens–Green Option =

The Greens–Green Option Els Verds–Opció Verda
- Leader: Joan Oms
- Founded: 19 May 1998
- Headquarters: C/ Bellavista, 31 1er. 1ª L'Hospitalet de Llobregat
- Ideology: Green politics Ecologism; Catalanism
- Political position: Left-wing
- National affiliation: Confederation of the Greens

Website
- www.elsverds-opcioverda.org

The Greens–Green Option (Catalan: Els Verds–Opció Verda; EV–OV), founded in May 1998, is a green political party in Catalonia. The party originated from a split in The Greens–Ecologist Confederation of Catalonia by members supportive of establishing close ties with Initiative for Catalonia (IC) after the latter broke away from United Left (IU). The party was originally led by Joan Oms and Josep Puig, who at the time of its founding were city councilors in the municipalities of Barcelona and L'Hospitalet de Llobregat, respectively.

IC's decision to seek an alliance with The Greens ahead of the 1999 European Parliament and local elections and its rebranding as "Initiative for Catalonia–Greens" (IC–V) led to the relationship between both parties deteriorating.

It is currently a member of the Confederation of the Greens.
