= ICV–EUiA =

Initiative for Catalonia Greens–United and Alternative Left Iniciativa per Catalunya Verds–Esquerra Unida i Alternativa
- Founded: 2003
- Dissolved: 2015
- Merger of: ICV; EUiA
- Succeeded by: Catalunya Sí que es Pot; En Comú Podem
- Ideology: Republicanism; Federalism; Socialism; Communism; Eco-socialism; Laicism; Ecologism; Progressivism; Catalanism
- Political position: Left-wing
- National affiliation: The Left (2009–2014)
- Regional affiliation: Catalan Agreement of Progress (2003–2015)

Website
- www.icveuia.cat

Initiative for Catalonia Greens–United and Alternative Left (Catalan: Iniciativa per Catalunya Verds–Esquerra Unida i Alternativa, ICV–EUiA) was an electoral alliance formed by Initiative for Catalonia Greens and United and Alternative Left to contest elections in Catalonia. Since 2015 both parties have participated in several coalitions: En Comú Podem for the 2015 and 2016 general elections, Catalunya Sí que es Pot for the 2015 Catalan regional election, and Catalunya en Comú for the 2017 Catalan regional election. Currently, they are represented in the Spanish Congress of Deputies within En Comú Podem and in the Parliament of Catalonia within Catalunya en Comú–Podem.

== Composition ==
Party	Notes
Initiative for Catalonia Greens (ICV)	
United and Alternative Left (EUiA)	
The Greens–Green Option (EV–OV)	Joined in October 2011 (within Plural Left).

== Electoral performance ==
=== Parliament of Catalonia ===
Parliament of Catalonia
Election	Leading candidate	Votes	%	Seats	+/–	Government
2003	Joan Saura	241,163	7.28 (#5)	9 / 135	6 (Note: Compared to Initiative for Catalonia–Greens totals in the 1999 regional election.)	Coalition
2006	Joan Saura	282,693	9.52 (#5)	12 / 135	3	Coalition
2010	Joan Herrera	230,824	7.37 (#4)	10 / 135	2	Opposition
2012	Joan Herrera	359,705	9.90 (#5)	13 / 135	3	Opposition

=== Cortes Generales ===
Cortes Generales
Election	Catalonia					
Election	Congress				Senate	
Election	Votes	%	Seats	+/–	Seats	+/–
2004	234,790	5.84 (#5)	2 / 47	1 (Note: Compared to Initiative for Catalonia–Greens totals in the 2000 general election.)	1 / 16	1 (Note: All Senate seats in the 2004–2011 period were elected within the Catalan Agreement of Progress alliance.)
2008	183,338	4.92 (#5)	1 / 47	1	1 / 16	0
2011	280,152	8.09 (#4)	3 / 47	2	1 / 16	0
