= Hermitage of Sant Medir =

Coordinates: 41°26′37″N 2°07′17″E

The Hermitage of Sant Medir is a Spanish church in the Serra de Collserola, in the municipality of Sant Cugat del Vallès, Vallès Occidental. It is located near the old Roman road from Ègara (Terrassa) to Barcino (Barcelona), which passed through Castrum Octavianum (Sant Cugat) before entering the Serra de Collserola through the Gausac valley (or Sant Medir valley). Every March 3, the traditional gathering of Sant Medir (aplec de Sant Medir) is held there. The building is included in the Inventory of the Architectural Heritage of Catalonia.

== Architecture ==
It is a restored Romanesque chapel that retains its original structure. The building has a rectangular floor plan, a barrel vault, and is oriented to the east. A double bell-gable rises above the facade. The door has a semicircular arch with voussoirs. Above it is a stone inscription and a bas-relief of a figure. The exterior walls are whitewashed, and there is no external apse.

== History ==
It already existed in 1046, but it is documented starting from 1120. The tradition and worship began in the 11th century. In 1024, the purchase of a vineyard and some woods located in the Sant Medir valley is recorded, as well as the establishment of an allod in 1046. Ancient documents refer to it as Sant Emeteri, but the name was Catalanized to "Medir". In the Middle Ages, it formed a parish with the Sant Adjutori and Sant Vicenç. The Monastery of Sant Cugat held civil jurisdiction over it until the 14th century, when it became part of the municipal organization of Sant Cugat. The monks took care of it until 1446.

The popularization of the legend of Saint Medir of Barcelona turned the hermitage into a destination for pilgrims. In 1802, the first gathering (aplec) of Sant Medir was celebrated, and starting in 1846, pilgrims from the Barcelona neighborhood of Gràcia joined in. Since then, it has been the destination of the Sant Medir festival pilgrimage every March 3. In July 1936, the hermitage was looted and burned. Inside, there are original 1948 sketches of mural paintings designed by the local artist Josep Grau-Garriga, which were never carried out. Over the course of 25 years until 2007, the Penya Regalèssia of Sant Cugat, together with technicians from the monastery's museum, carried out various restoration tasks on the building, such as repairing the roof and restoring the 17th-century pavement.
