= Sant Cugat Museum =

Museum in San Cugat del Vallés, Spain

Coordinates: 41°28′27.86″N 2°5′7.08″E

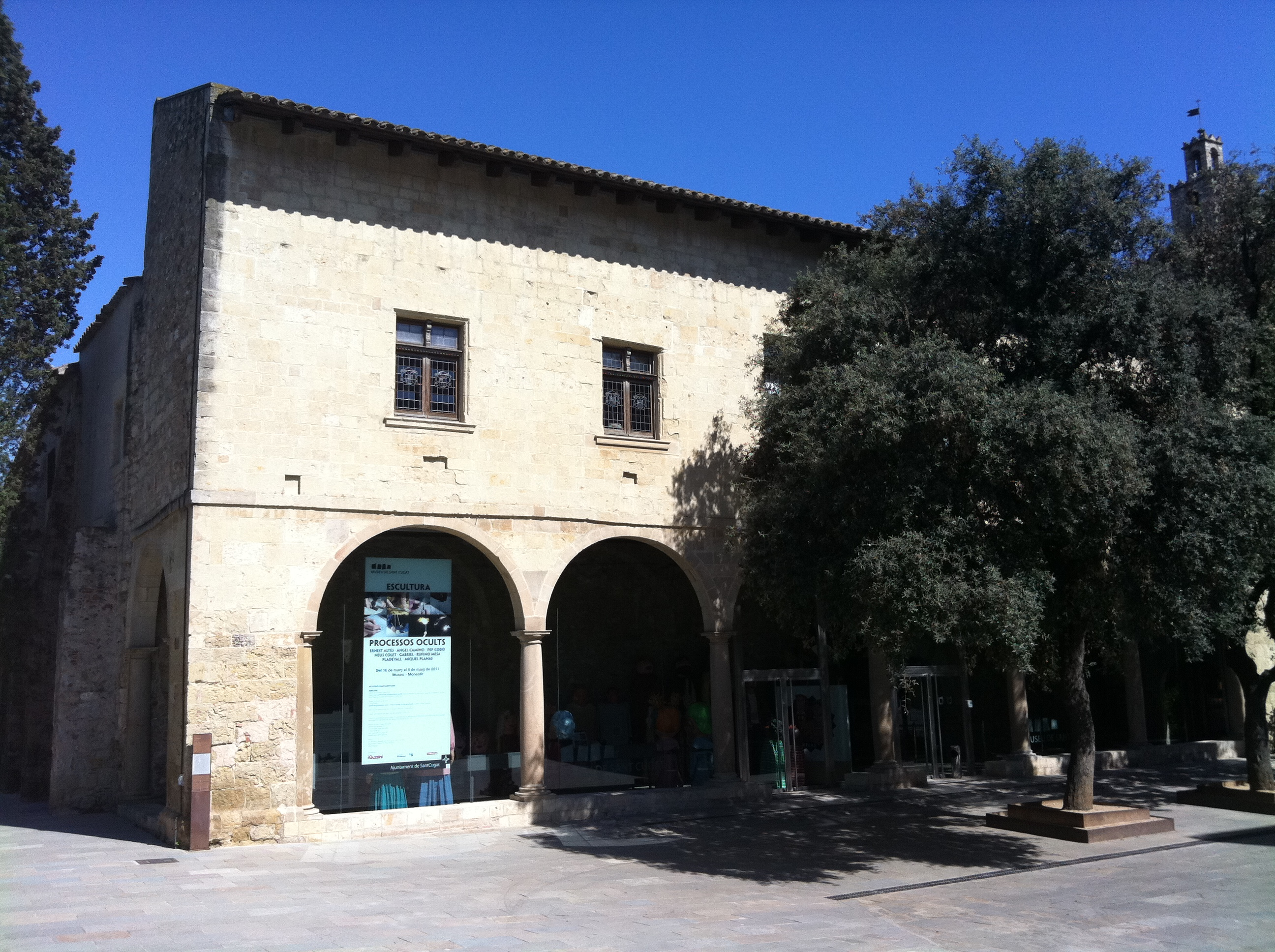
Façade of Sant Cugat Museum headquarters, at the Monastery of Sant Cugat

The Sant Cugat Museum (Catalan: Museu de Sant Cugat, Spanish: Museo de Sant Cugat) was opened on 23 April 2003; its mission was to oversee the conservation and dissemination of the historic, artistic and cultural heritage of Sant Cugat del Vallès in Catalonia. It is part of the Barcelona Provincial Council Local Museum Network and has two centres: the Sant Cugat Monastery and Casa Aymat plus two other buildings, the Celler Modernista and the Chapel of Sant Domenec. In both areas there are spaces reserved for temporary exhibitions related to art, history and local and universal heritage. In addition, the Museum works to recover the heritage and memory of the town, periodically organising walks that help people discover local history and heritage.

== Centres ==
=== Sant Cugat Monastery ===
The Monastery of Sant Cugat was built between the 9th and 14th centuries and is the Museum’s headquarters. In addition to the visit to the cloister and church, there are also rooms located around the cloister that have been museumized into an interpretation centre for medieval monasteries. The permanent exhibition explains monastery architecture, how the Romanesque capitals were cut, what the monastic code of The Rule of Saint Benedict stated, and how the Sant Cugat Monastery evolved from its founding in the 9th century to secularisation in 1835 under the Ecclesiastical Confiscations of Mendizábal.

=== Casa Aymat ===
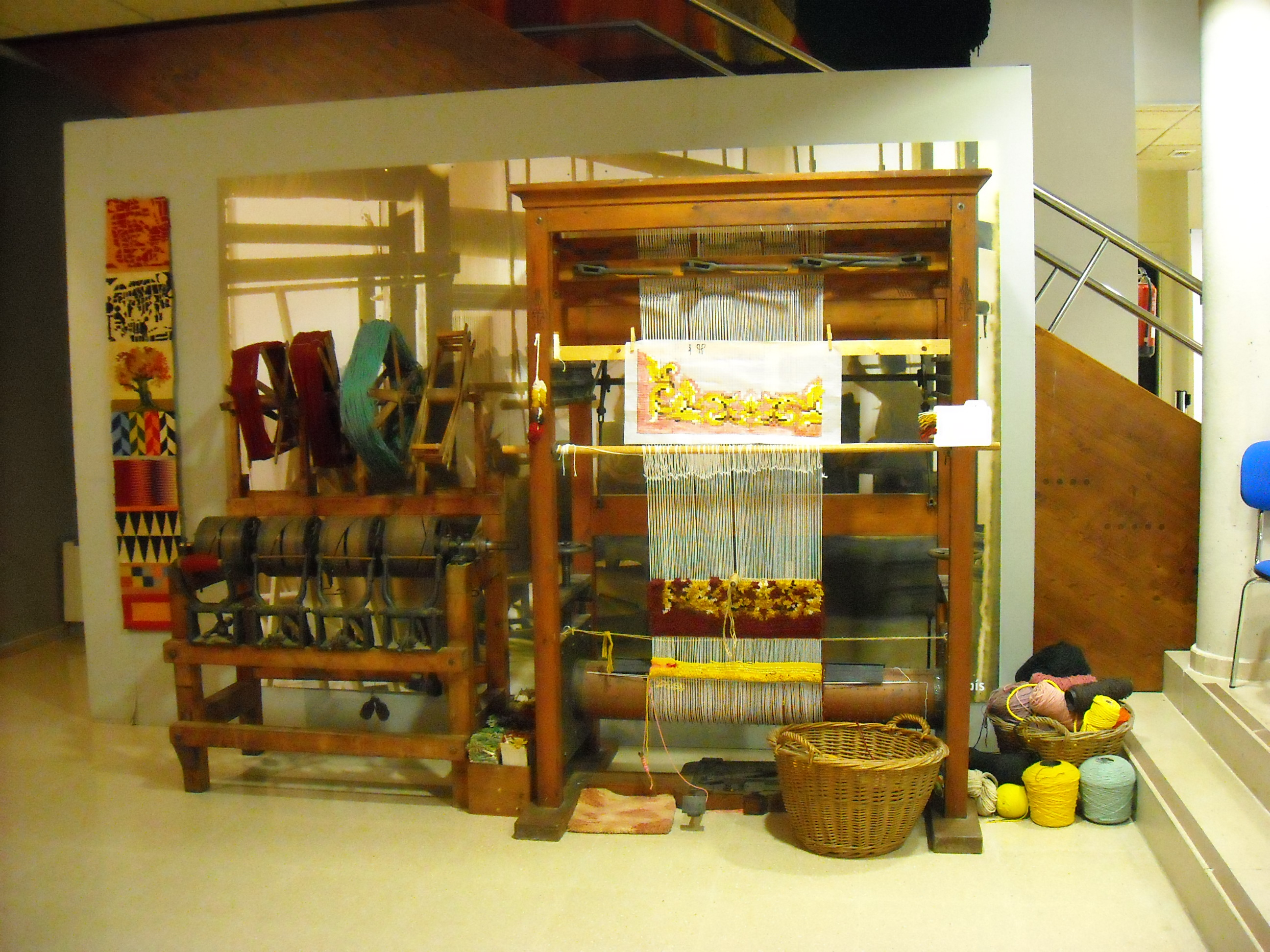
Casa Aymat's permanent exhibition

A sub-office of the Museum, Casa Aymat was built in 1926 as Tomàs Aymat’s rug and tapestry factory, later on becoming the head office of the Catalan Tapestry School. It currently houses the Contemporary Tapestry Museum and displays the traditional beginnings and Noucentista tendencies of Tomàs Aymat through to the era of the Catalan Tapestry School, with Josep Grau-Garriga as the most noteworthy alumnus. The exhibition includes boards and tapestries by Subirachs, Ràfols-Casamada, Guinovart and Hernàndez Pijuan, among others.

== Other museum buildings ==
=== Celler modernista ===
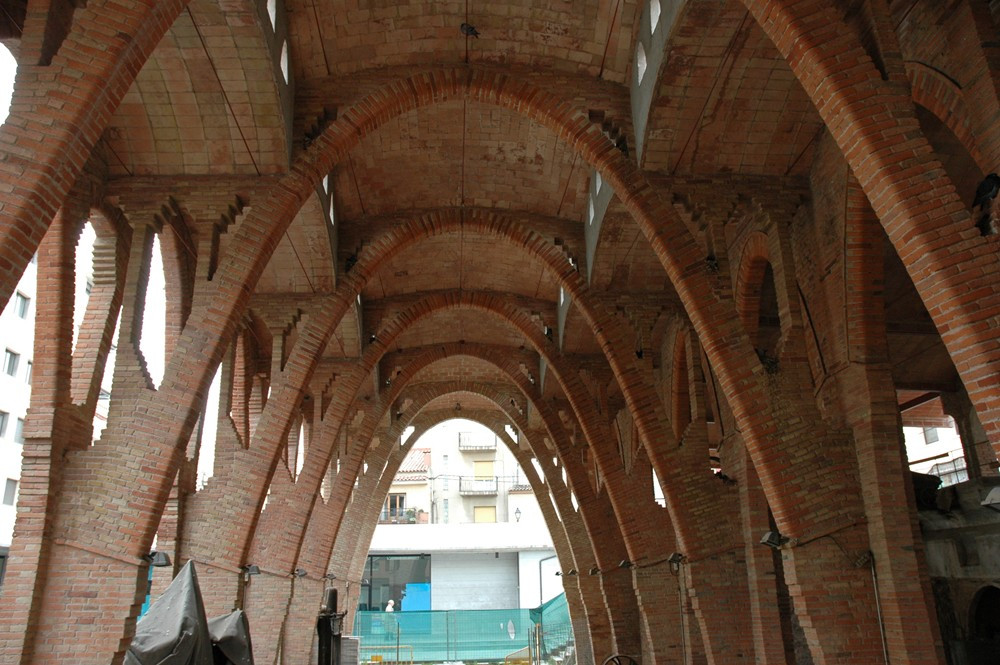
Celler Modernista

This is all that remains of the cooperative wine press, begun in 1921 to the design of Cesar Martinell, an architect who specialised in agricultural building at that time, inspired both by Gaudi's art nouveau design and the rationalism of the beginning of the 20th century. The wine industry declined after the 1950s and the last pressing was completed in 1988. The surrounding buildings were demolished, including, in 1994, the hall for vats, to allow for the expansion of urban building. In the remaining hall, exhibitions are shown and can be visited on certain days, particularly weekends.

=== Chapel of Sant Domenec ===
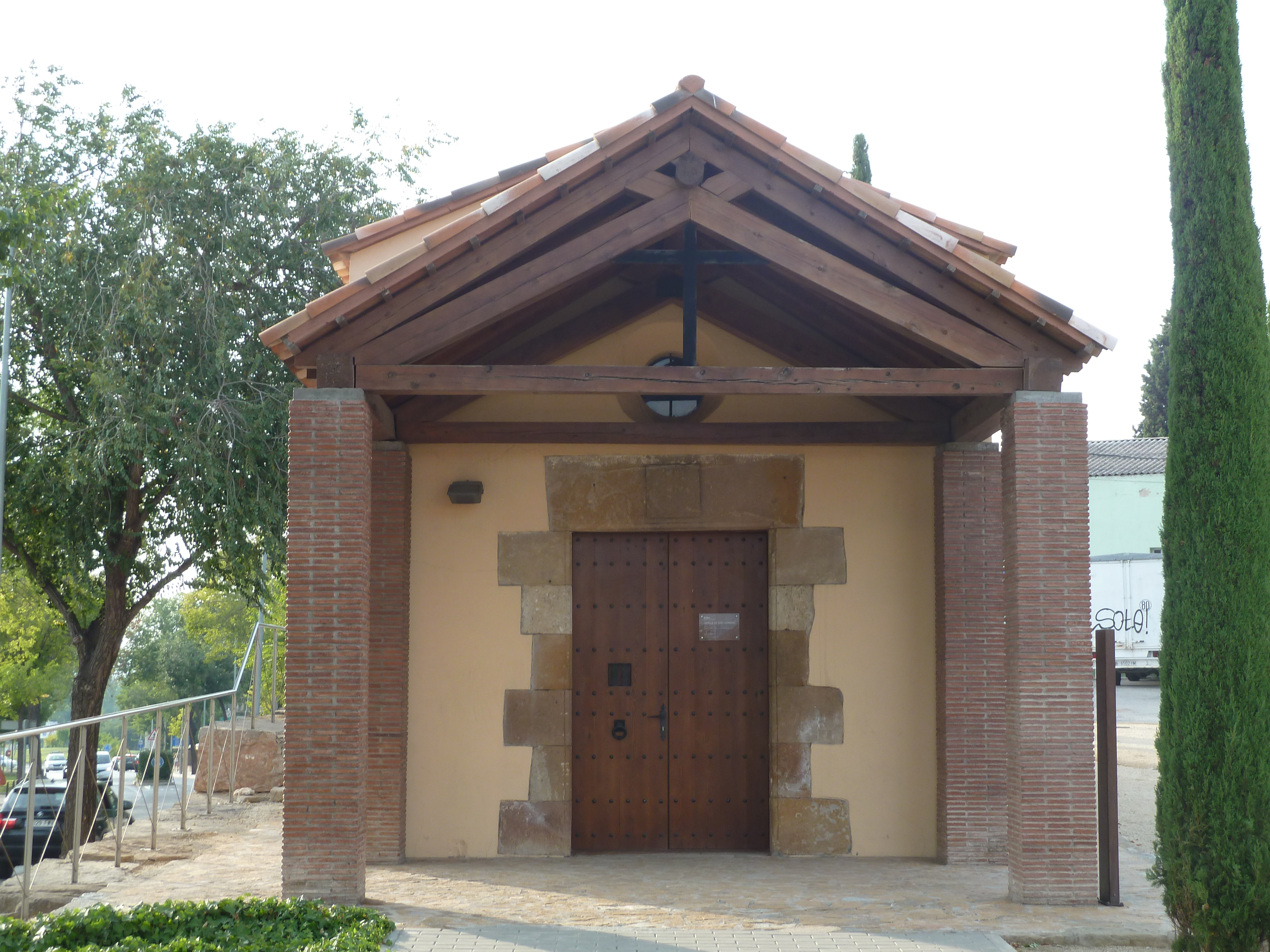
Chapel of Sant Domenec

A small chapel on the road linking the Benedictine monasteries of Sant Cugat and Sant Llorenç del Munt via the towns of Sant Cugat, Sant Quirze, Terrassa and Matadepera. There are exhibitions about the Monks' Path and the Battle of Sant Cugat during the Peninsular War but the chapel is rarely open.

== See also ==
- Monastery of Sant Cugat
