= Rabassada Road =

Road in Spain

Coordinates: 41°26′39″N 02°05′53″E

- Arrabassada Road
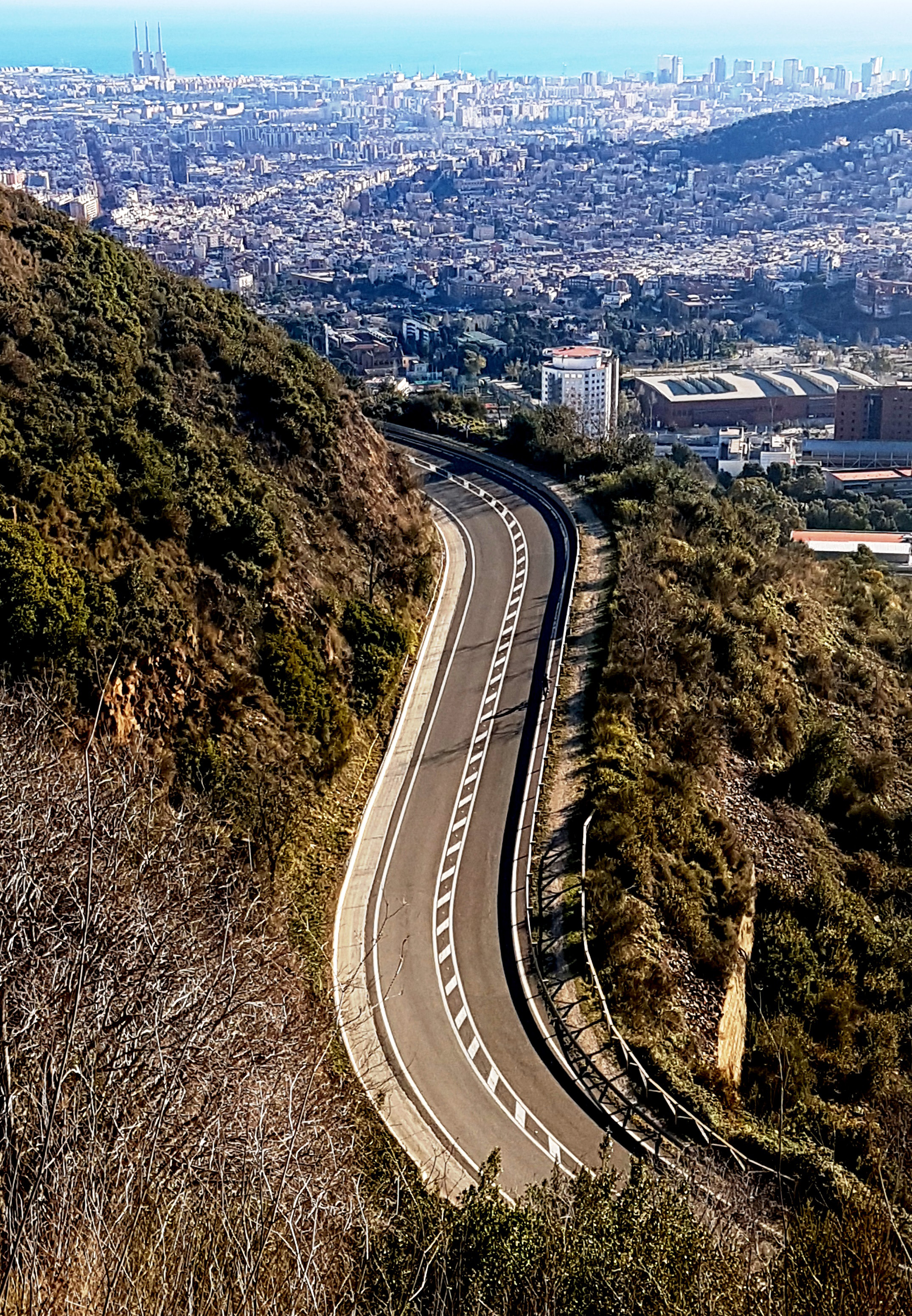
- View from the Rabassada, overlooking Barcelona

Route information
- Length: 6.3 km (3.9 mi)
- Existed: early 20th century–present

Major junctions
- East end: Barcelona
- West end: Sant Cugat del Vallès

Location
- Country: Spain
- Autonomous community: Catalonia
- Province: Barcelona

Highway system
- Highways in Spain; Autopistas and autovías; National Roads; Primary Highways in Catalonia

The Rabassada Road or Arrabassada Road (Note: Rabassada is the correct toponym.) (Spanish: La carretera de la Rabassada o carretera de la Arrabassada; BP-1417) connects the municipalities of Barcelona and Sant Cugat del Vallès, crossing the Serra de Collserola via the Coll de l'Erola.

The route is very winding due to the mountainous topography of the Collserola range. Among Barcelona residents, the road is known for its high number of traffic accidents and for the illegal car and motorcycle races frequently organized there. Halfway along the road lie the ruins of the historic Casino de la Rabassada. Traffic flow is heavy, and the road not only links the two towns but is also used to reach the Tibidabo Amusement Park.

== Gallery ==
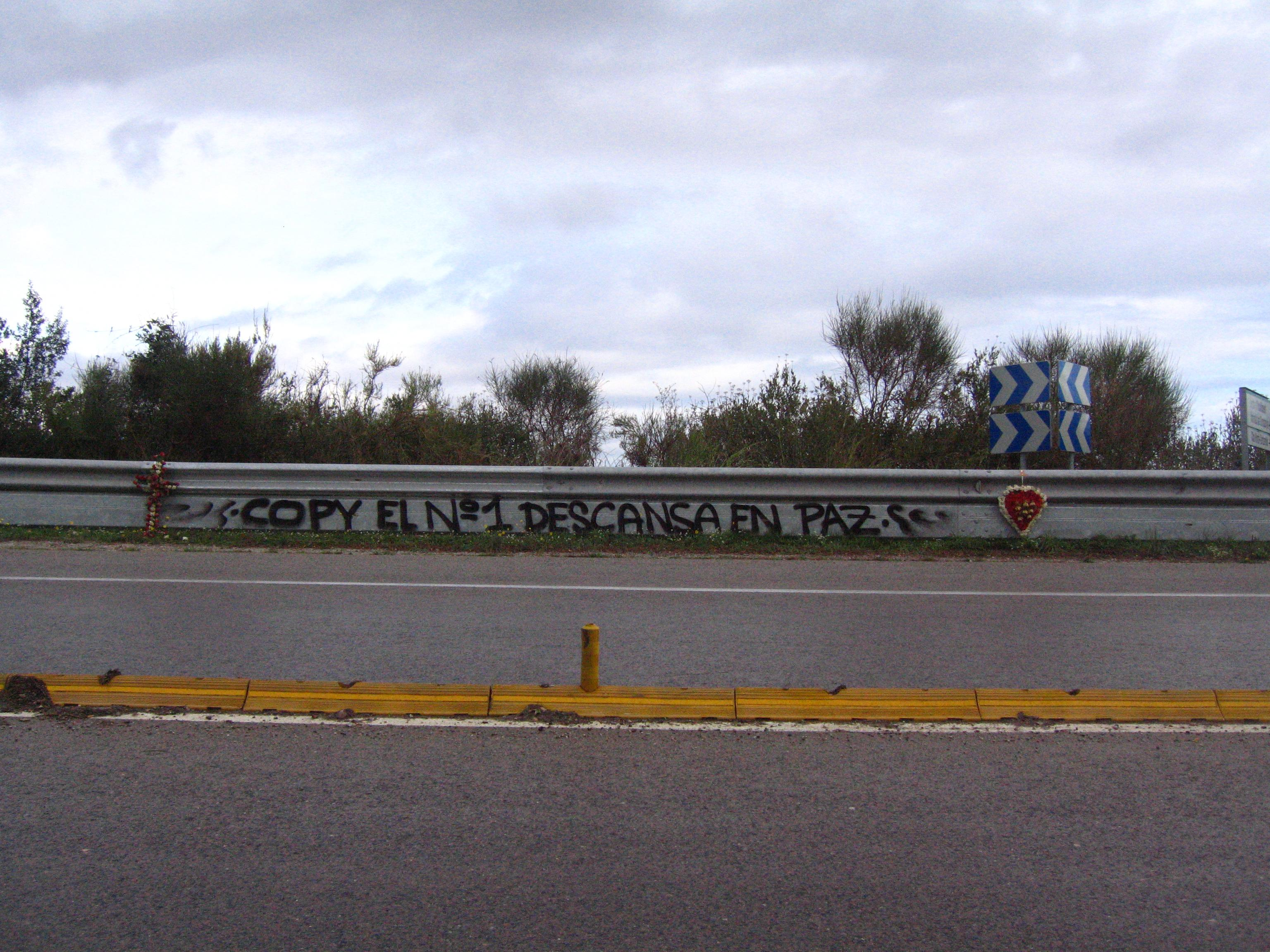
Graffiti on the Rabassada road, Barcelona, marking the site of an accident

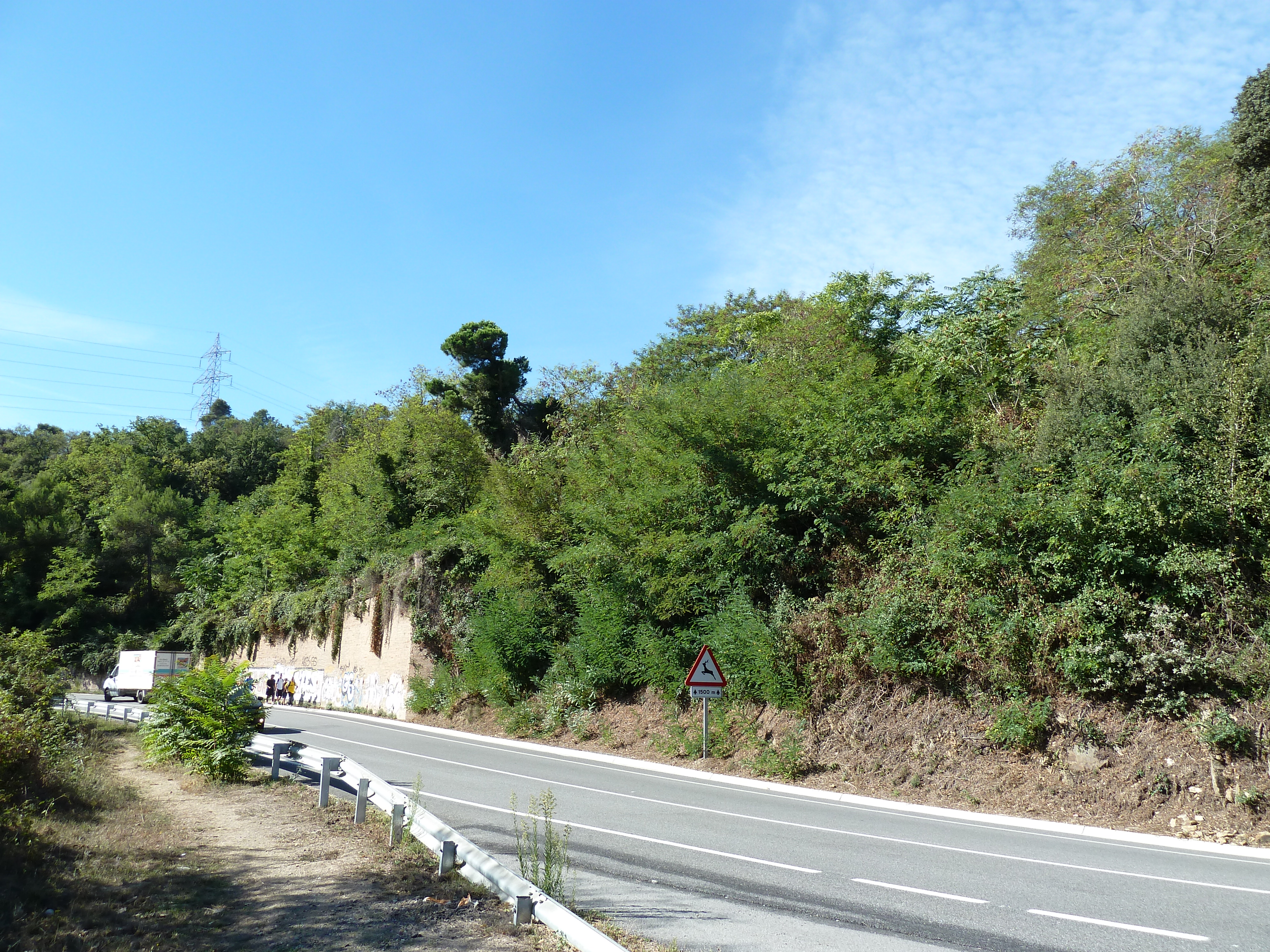
Rabassada road in 2012
