= Torre Negra =

Coordinates: 41°27′55″N 2°06′03″E

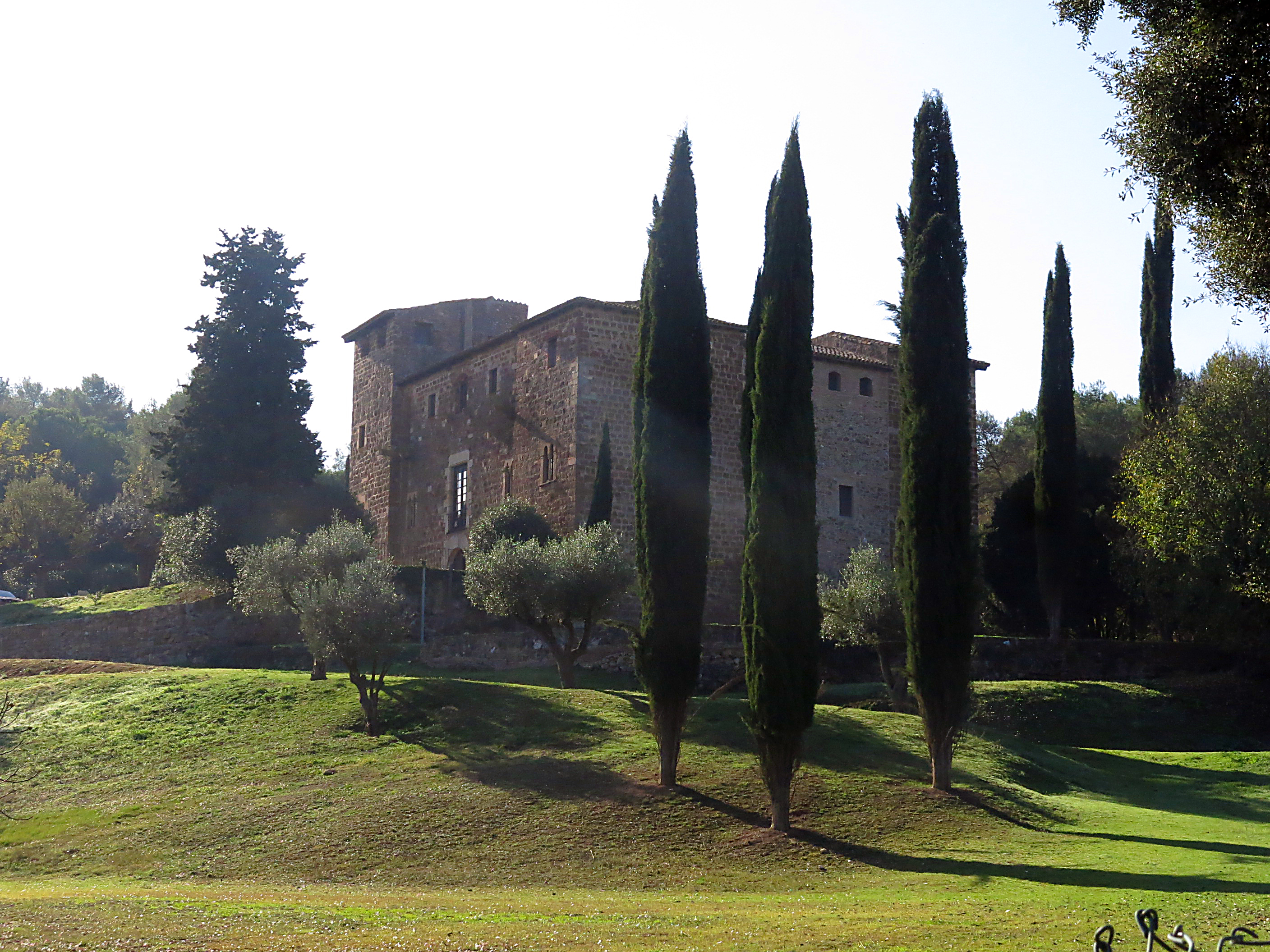
Image of Torre Negra in 2020

Torre Negra is a 12th-century fort built in 1145 in Catalonia, to defend the territories of Sant Cugat.

Torre Negra is a fortified building built in a strategic defensive position. The fort consists of three floors and an observation platform with arrow and cannon windows on some angles. Most of the structure is made of stone and most of its windows have iron bars.

== History ==
The fort has its origins in 1455 when a strategist from the Monastery of Sant Cugat (Monestir de Sant Cugat) commissioned it as a point of defense in case of an invasion. The first owners were the Vilanova family who were one of the founders of the Monastery. The tower was only used in minor conflicts in 1455 and has for the most part been owned by private owners ever since. The interior is estimated to have been renovated completely five times through the ages, in the hands of many rich people. The council of Sant Cugat has now published plans to buy the fort. This is due to the environmental concerns and protection of a historical place.
