= Arnau Cadell =

Catalan sculptor

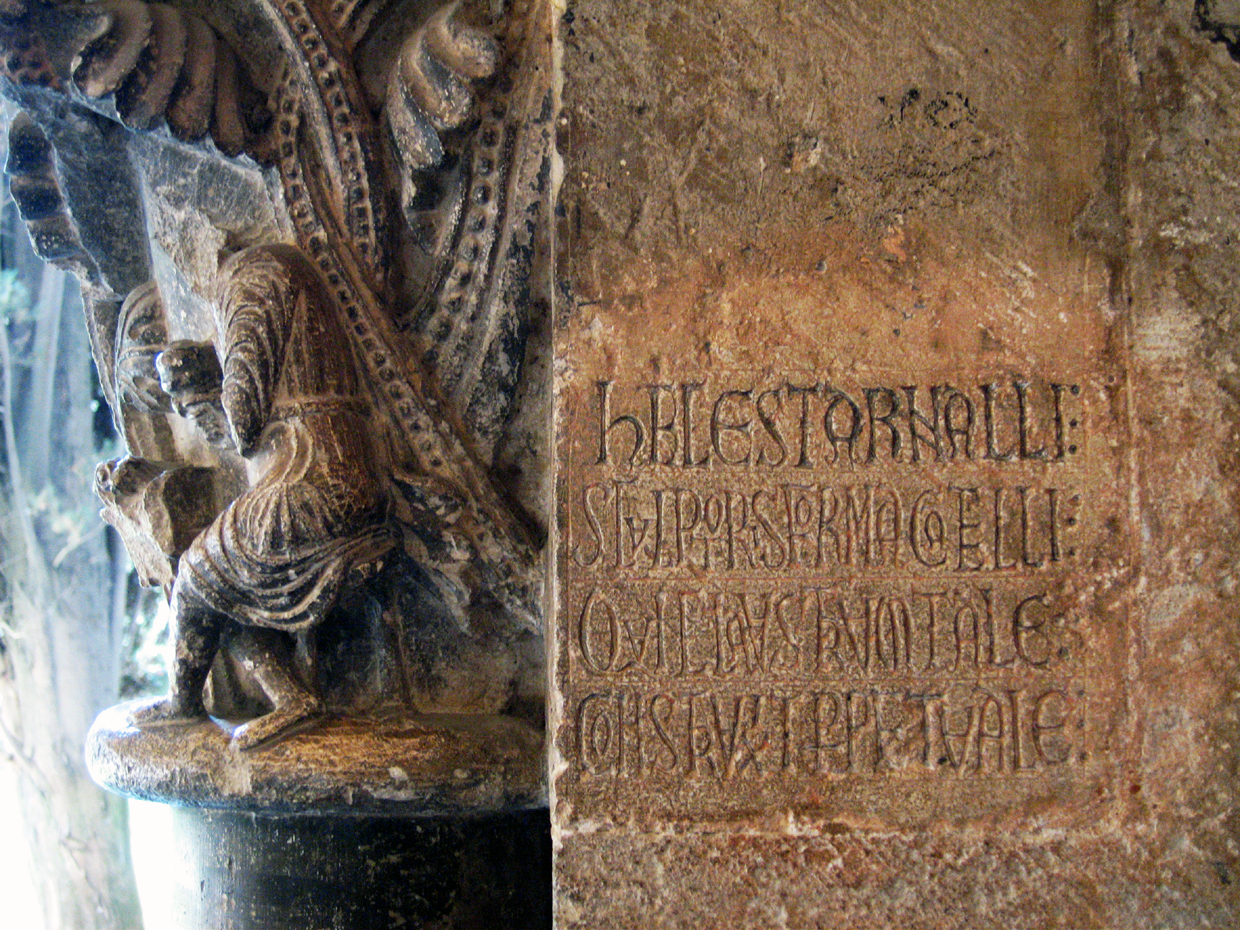
Capital in the Monastery of Sant Cugat with self-portrait and inscription by Cadell

Arnau Cadell (also spelt Gatell or Catell) was a 12th–13th-century Catalan sculptor. He is best known for creating the cloister of the monastery of Sant Cugat.

== Biography ==
Cadell was a Catalan architect, sculptor and master builder. He was in charge of a workshop of travelling artisans specialized in ornamentation depicting biblical themes. It is believed that Cadell went to Sant Cugat with his workshop to work on the monastery there. In addition to the capitals and cloisters he designed at the monastery of Sant Cugat, which was begun in 1190, he is also attributed with similar work in the Cathedral of Girona. He has also been linked to the design of the portals of the church of St. Peter in Santpedor and at the Santa Maria de Manresa basilica.

The designs created by Cadell on the capitals represent vegetation, Corinthian figures, scenes from the lives of monks and historic themes from the Bible. The Sant Cugat cloister for which he is most widely recognized, contains 144 Corinthian capitals, completed over several years. The capitals towards the east, west and north are estimated to have been completed towards the end of the 12th century and the ones towards the south in the early 13th century. On one of the pillars there is a self-portrait of Cadell carving out a Corinthian capital.

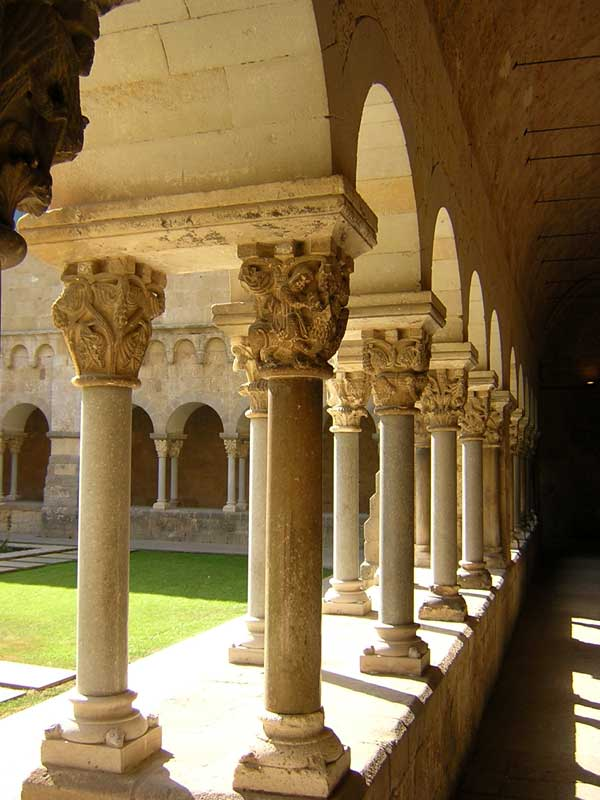
Cloister of the Sant Cugat monastery

Similarities between Cadell's sculptors and others such as the capitals at the Sant Pere de Galligants abbey, the cloisters at the Cathedral of Girona and at the Musée des Augustins in Toulouse. The similarities to the museum in Toulouse reflect the influence of the Toulouse school on his work. However, it is believed that he trained in Girona itself, where he died.

Cadell is thought to have made the cloisters at the Cathedral of Girona between 1180 and 1190, shortly before moving to Sant Cugat to work on the monastery. Though there are no records attesting to this, comparisons of the two sculptures demonstrate strong likeness between the techniques and figures used: Both include biblical themes and scenes of everyday life.

== Signature ==
Cadell is the first Catalan artist who was known by both first and last name. A testament by him, dated 13 October 1221 and signed in Girona, has been preserved, in which he donates his assets to the monastery of Sant Cugat. A copy of this document was found in Pia Almoina del Pa in Girona, in Girona, lodged inside a drawer. The contents of the will indicates that Arnau Cadell owned real estate in Sant Cugat and had loans in Girona. The will is now housed in the Diocesis of Girona's archives.

Among the cloisters at the Sant Cugat monastery there is a signature in Latin, located on a pillar at the northeast of the cloister, that accompanies Cadell's self-portrait,:

hec est arnalli sculptoris forma catelli qui claustrum tale construxit perpetuale

Two documents connected with the monastery, from 1206 and 1207, also bear his signature.

== Legacy ==
It appears that Cadell died childless, as attested by his will leaving assets to a young nephew and a significant charitable donation bequeathed to the monastery of Sant Cugat, that still owed him a considerable amount for the work done on the cloisters. The will provided a share among the monks and donations to various altars in the church. The monastery, therefore paid cheaply for the sculptures. There is no reference in the will of Cadell's artistic activities.

Cadell's name also lives on in the local high school, IES Arnau Cadell, located in nearby Valldoreix.

== Sources ==
- J. Yarva Lucas (1993). Arnau Cadell. Rome: Istituto della Enciclopedia italiana. pp. 37–38.
