= Muntanya Russa (Tibidabo Amusement Park) =

Rollercoaster at Tibidabo Amusement Park in Barcelona, Spain

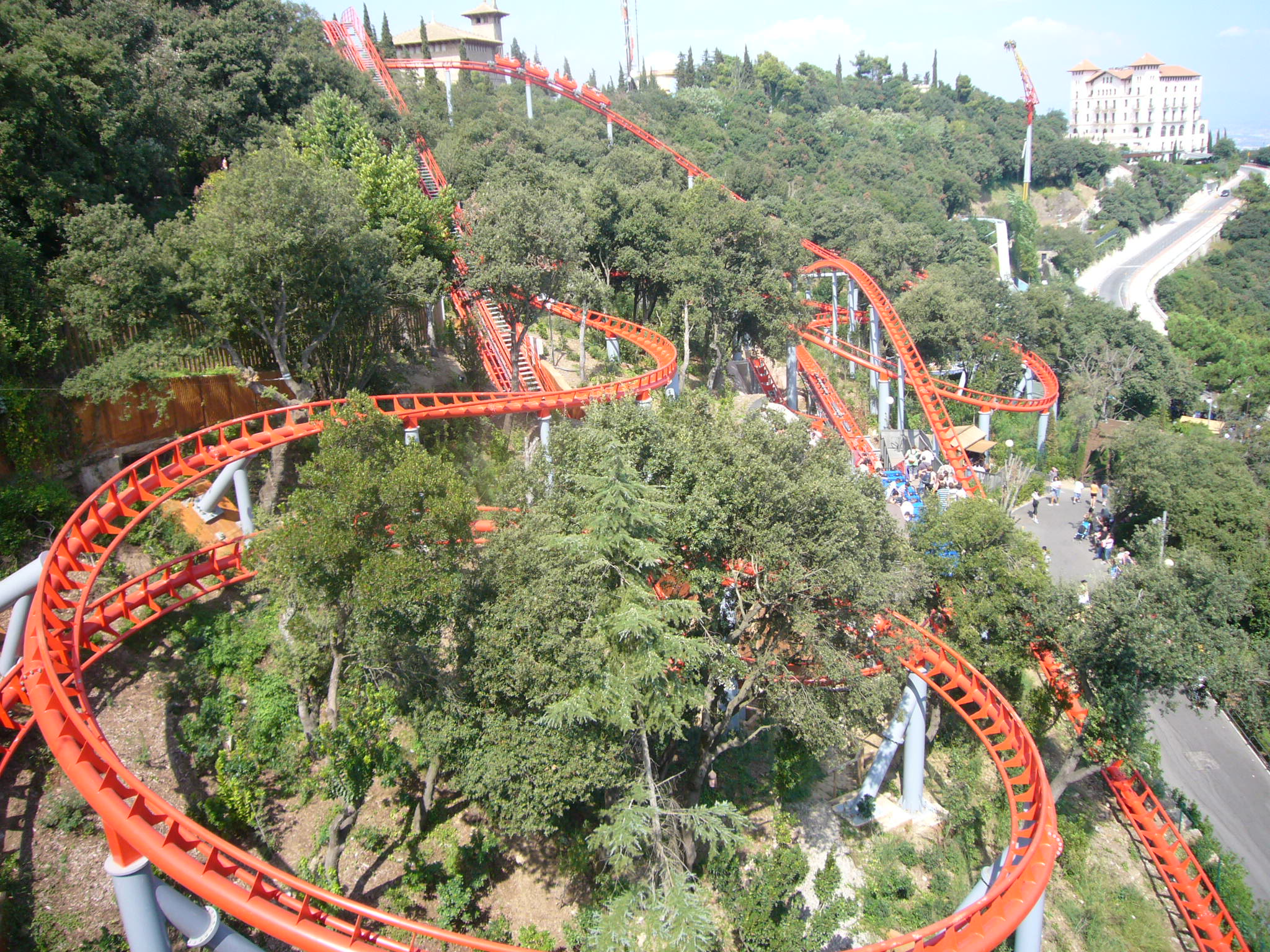

Tibidabo Amusement Park
- Location: Tibidabo Amusement Park
- Coordinates: 41.422816°N 2.119845°E
- Status: Operating
- Opening date: 23 December 2008

General statistics
- Type: Steel
- Manufacturer: Vekoma
- Designer: RCS GmbH
- Height: 82 ft (25 m)
- Drop: 101 ft (31 m)
- Length: 2,427 ft (740 m)
- Speed: 49.7 mph (80.0 km/h)
- Inversions: 0
- Duration: 00:50
- Capacity: 1010 riders per hour
- G-force: 3.5
- Trains: 2 trains with 4 cars. Riders are arranged 2 across in 2 rows for a total of 16 riders per train.
- Muntanya Russa at RCDB

Muntanya Russa (translated from Catalan to Roller Coaster) is an amusement ride of Tibidabo Amusement Park in Barcelona, Spain.

== History ==
Following the acquisition of Tibidabo Amusement Park by the City of Barcelona, the park began an investment of 50 million Euros for improvements. Among other projects, it added Insalaron lift and created Camí del Cel. In 2007 the park added a large roller coaster in the middle of the forest. This created great unease among neighbours. In late 2007, the Netherlands Vekoma introduced the compometinedose project to respect the environment and minimize environmental and visual impact. Marks in the trees fired alarms, and events created and collected signatures. In May 2008 the project began felling trees, and removed the Transmóvil attraction. In December 2008 the first tests were conducted. This attraction cost 3 million Euro.

The attraction opened on 23 December 2008. That day, demonstrators gathered at the park entrance to protest and the alleged environmental damage.

== Ride ==
After leaving the train station, the car curves to the right to enter a small tunnel, where it rises 33 metres. At the highest point it reaches 52 metres above sea level. It again curves to the right, and starts to fall. After this, it turns sharply left and travels for 50 seconds in the woods Collserola.

The station has no roof and is accessed via an oval-shaped ramp. Access to the queue area is through a small cave.

The attraction features two identical trains (one is red and one blue). Each train has 4 cars, each with 2 lanes for 2 passengers, totaling 16 per train, or a maximum of 1010 passengers per hour. Each passenger has a personal safety bar.

The attraction has a service for Photo-Ride.

Passengers must be at least 120 centimetres tall, and is fully accessible. The attraction is the red routes, carriers and gray.

== Controversy ==
Putting the attraction in a forest generated unease among some neighbours. Activist groups Tibidabo SOS and Salvem Collserola collected signatures and travelled to Brussels to oppose the project. In April 2008, activists chained themselves to trees. In July 2008, MiraMiralls broke out. On 23 December 2008, coinciding with the attraction opening, activists were at the park gate with banners and mask with a photo of Jordi Hereu. According to official sources, subsequently transferred to El País and La Vanguardia, 58 trees were removed, most felled, and many others transplanted elsewhere in the park. In addition, the City of Barcelona committed to planting over 200 new trees.

== Removing the old rollercoaster ==
The old roller coaster, Montaña Russa, was built in 1961. It had been causing technical problems for years. Its last trip came on 5 January 2009. Web portals such as CAPTE offered tributes to the attraction.
