= Tibidabo Amusement Park =

Amusement Park in Barcelona

Tibidabo
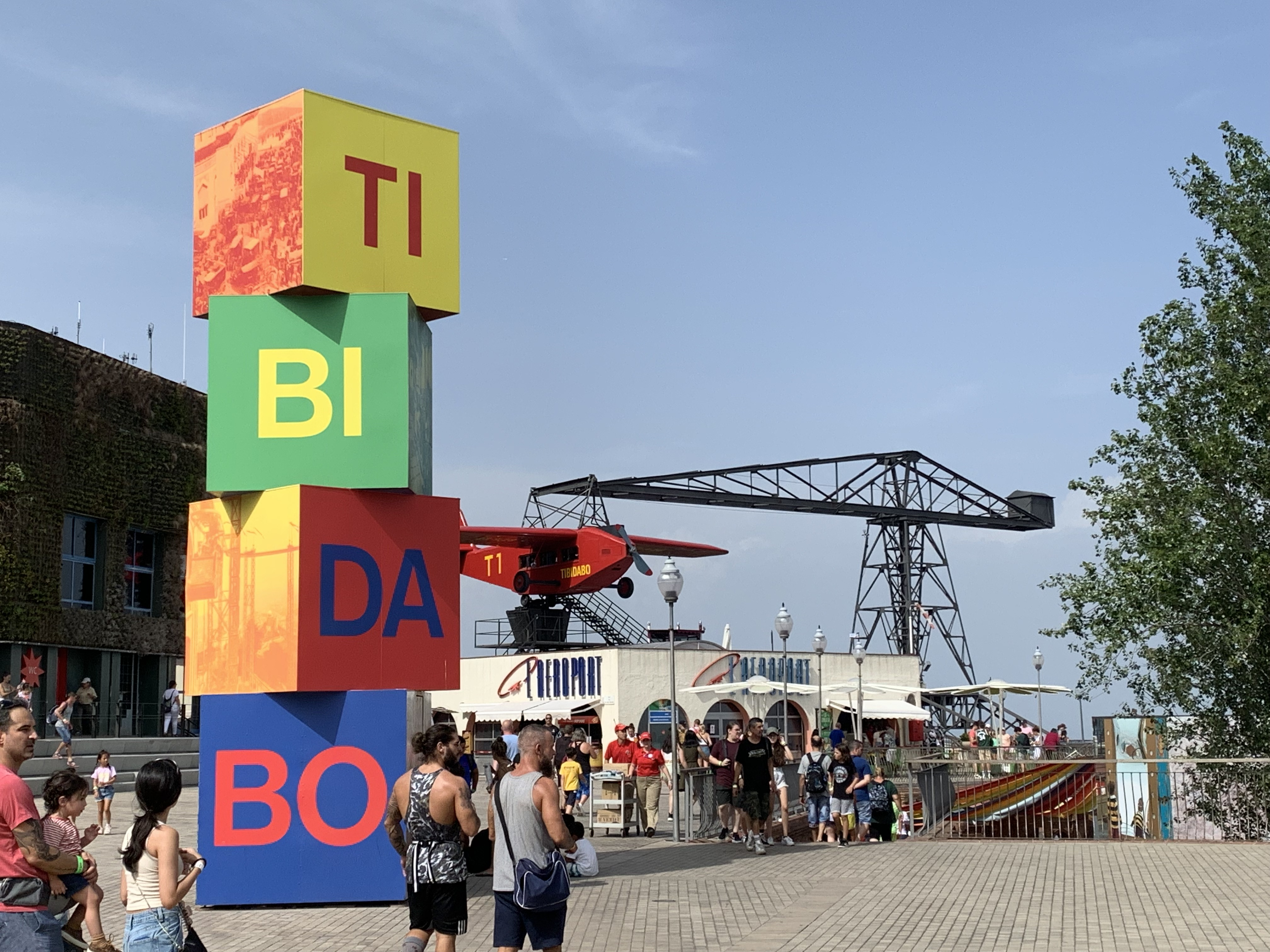
- Interactive map of Tibidabo
- Location: Barcelona, Catalonia, Spain
- Coordinates: 41.4222°N 2.1199°E
- Status: Operating
- Opened: 1899
- Owner: City Council of Barcelona
- Operated by: Barcelona de Serveis Municipals, S.A. (B:SM)
- General manager: Jaume Collboni Cuadrado
- Operating season: March - December
- Area: 7 ha (17 acres)

Attractions
- Total: 31
- Roller coasters: 2
- Water rides: 2
- Website: www.tibidabo.cat/ca/parc-datraccions

Tibidabo Amusement Park (Catalan: Parc d'Atraccions Tibidabo) is an amusement park located on Tibidabo in the Collserola Ridge in Barcelona. The park was built in 1899 by the entrepreneur Salvador Andreu and opened in 1905. The park is among the oldest in the world still functioning. It is Spain's longest running amusement park. Most of the original rides, some of which date to the turn of the 20th century, are still in use. The park is now owned by the Barcelona City Council.

== History ==
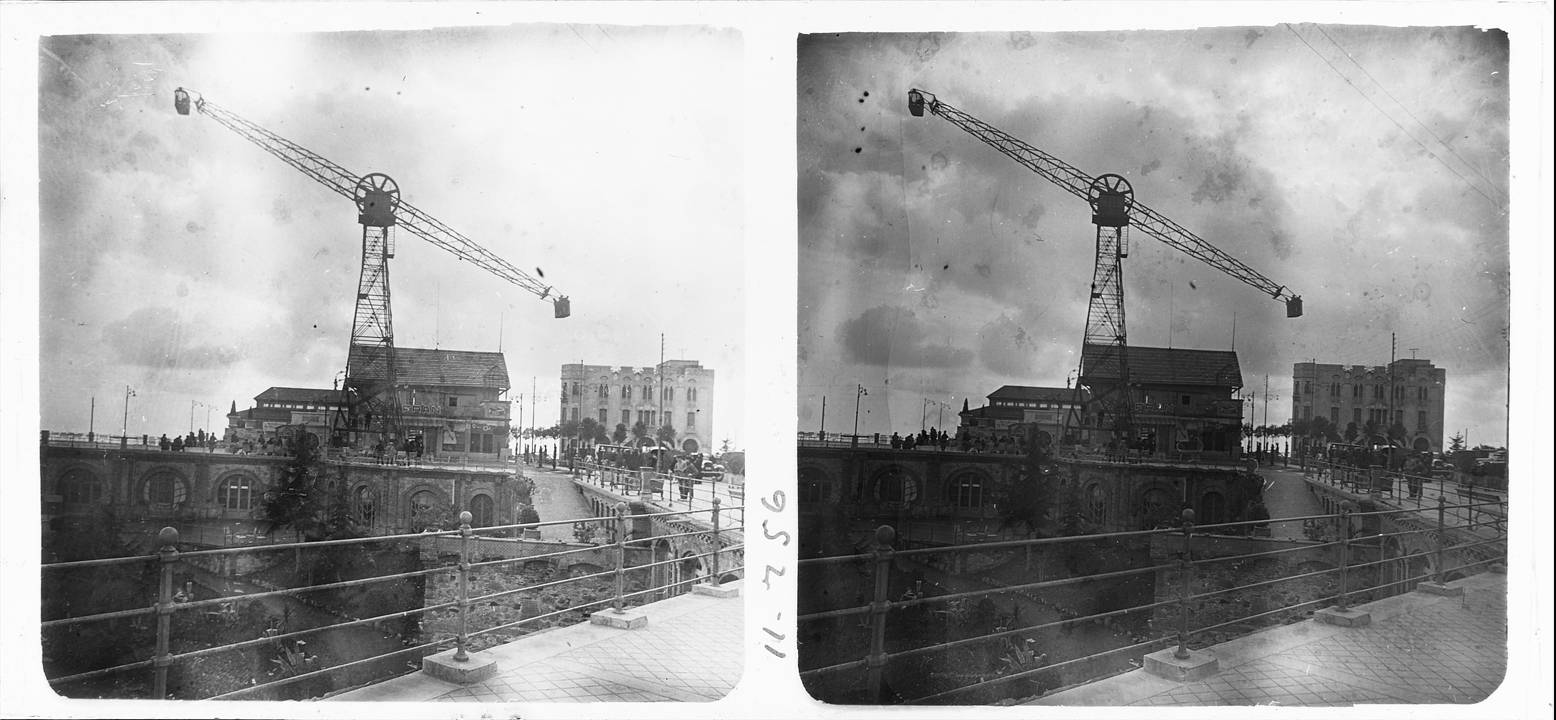
Atalaia

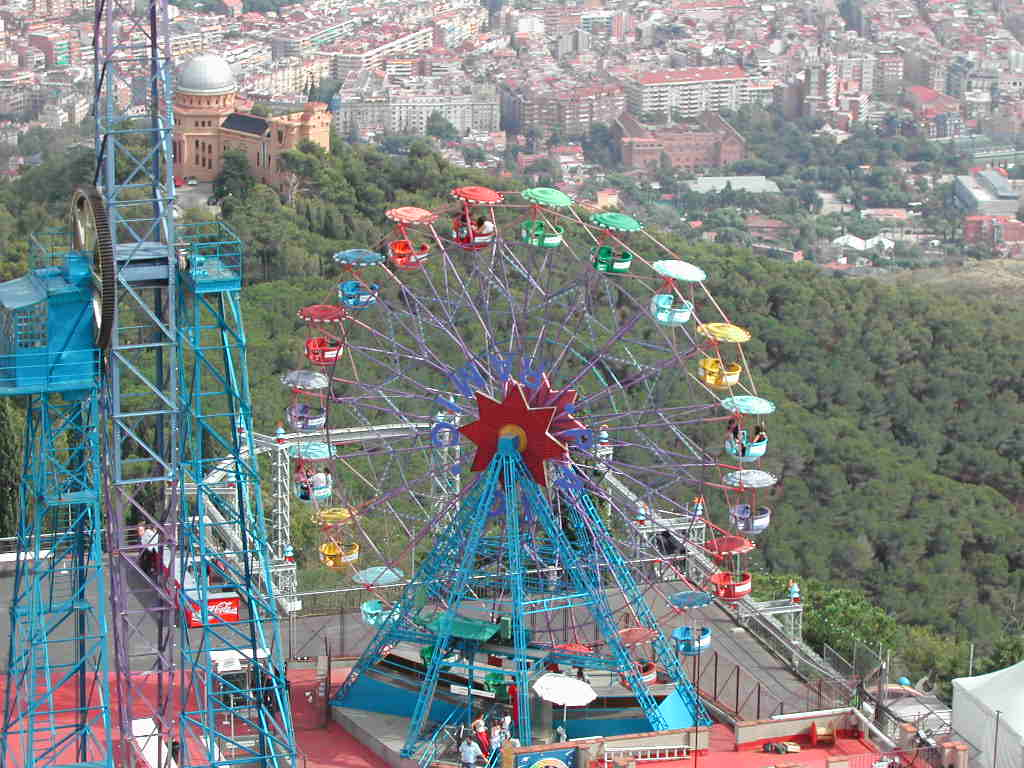

An amusement park on the Tibidabo mountain was first proposed in 1899 by pharmacist Salvador Andreu, who envisioned a funicular, tram line, and amusement rides. Work formally began on the Tranvía Azul and funicular on June 16, 1900, with both being inaugurated by Barcelona cardinal Salvador Casañas y Pagés on October 29, 1901. The first amusement rides however weren't installed until 1905 – mostly smaller attractions such as binoculars, mirrors, automaton displays, and various games. Throughout the next two decades, the fledgling amusement park began to install more major rides, such as the Avió, Ferrocarril Aéreo (now Embruixabruixes), and Talaia, all three of which are still in operation today.

Tibidabo continued to prosper through to the late 1950s and 1960s, where the rise of the SEAT 600 city cars was said to have contributed to a decline in attendance, as residents were able to travel elsewhere. In 1987, Spanish businessman Javier de la Rosa bought the park and created the holding company Grand Tibidabo in 1982, merging Tibidabo's existing operating company with the National Leasing Consortium. Under his leadership, the park invested in many new attractions from the Italian and German markets between the late 80s and early 90s, including the Tibidabo Express powered roller coaster, Hurakan top spin, Carrusel, and Diàvolo. De la Rosa was eventually charged with fraud and siphoning millions of dollars from the company, having inappropriately looted 68 million euros from the company over time. Tibidabo continued through the 1990s with million dollar losses annually, with the company eventually filing for bankruptcy in 1999. With the business on the verge of collapse following financial and management turmoil, the park's land was auctioned off to Chupa Chups before the Barcelona City Council took over for 791 million pesetas ($5.06M USD, €4.754M).

Over the years, Tibidabo has continued to invest in significant attractions. A thrill ride, Pèndol, was built in 2006 but ultimately removed after a serious accident in 2010 that resulted in the death of a rider. Investigators have since attributed mechanical fault to the incident. The 2008/2009 winter season saw the retirement of their iconic Montaña Rusa in favor of the new Muntanya Russa, a custom-designed coaster from Vekoma that hugs the hillside terrain while providing a picturesque view of the city. In 2014, the park inaugurated their current and newest ferris wheel, Giradabo, which runs on their top deck where its predecessor stood. During the 2017 and 2023 seasons, new virtual reality experiences were introduced on the respective Virtual Express and Muntanya Russa coasters. Their most recent attraction is Merlí, a 50-metre (160 ft) tall drop tower that opened in July 2024.

== Attractions ==
Tibidabo is divided into five levels. Guests enter the park at the top level, and gradually work their way down to the bottom, where a majority of the park's attractions can be found.

=== Level 6 — Panoramic Area ===
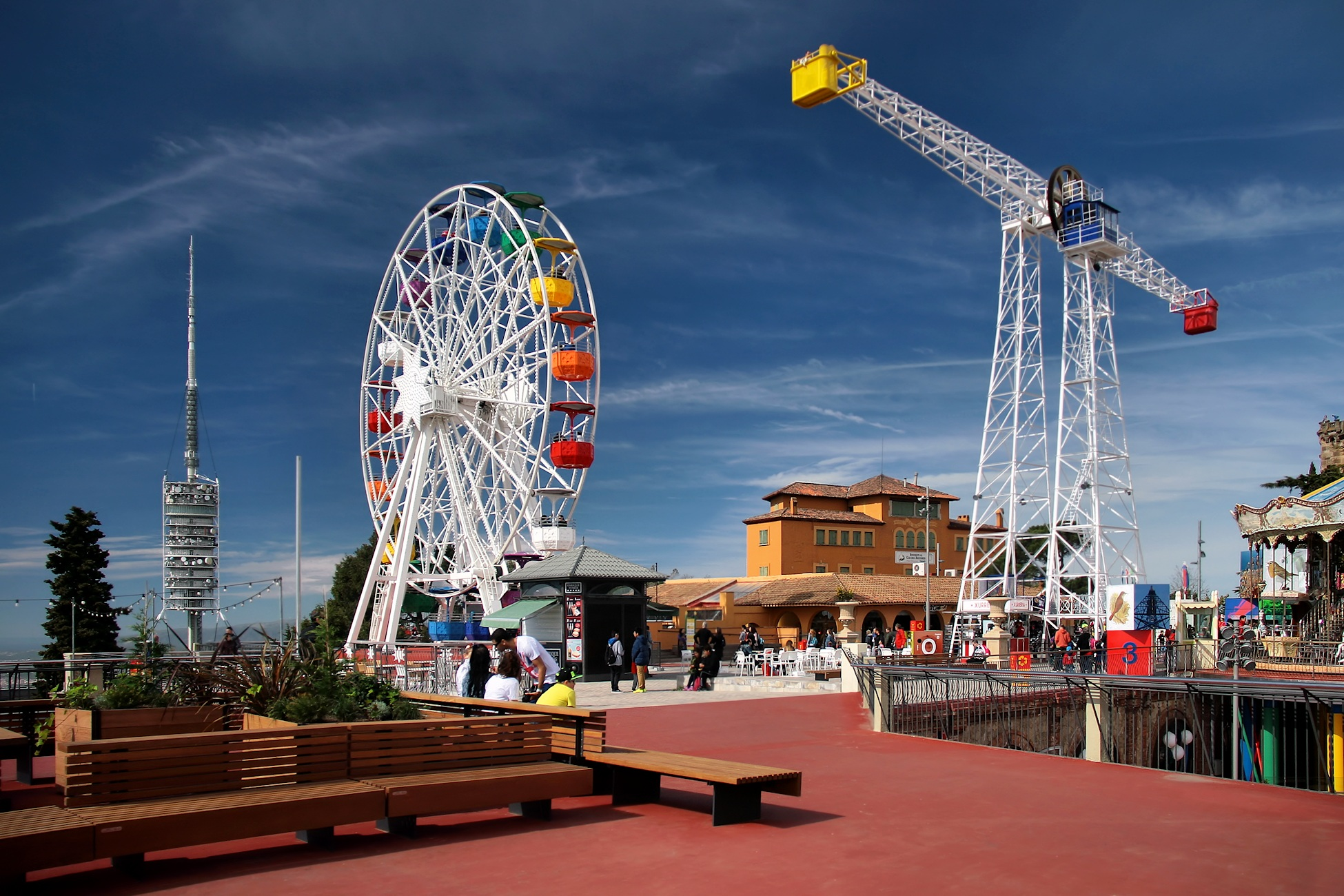
Giradabo (left) and Talaia (right)

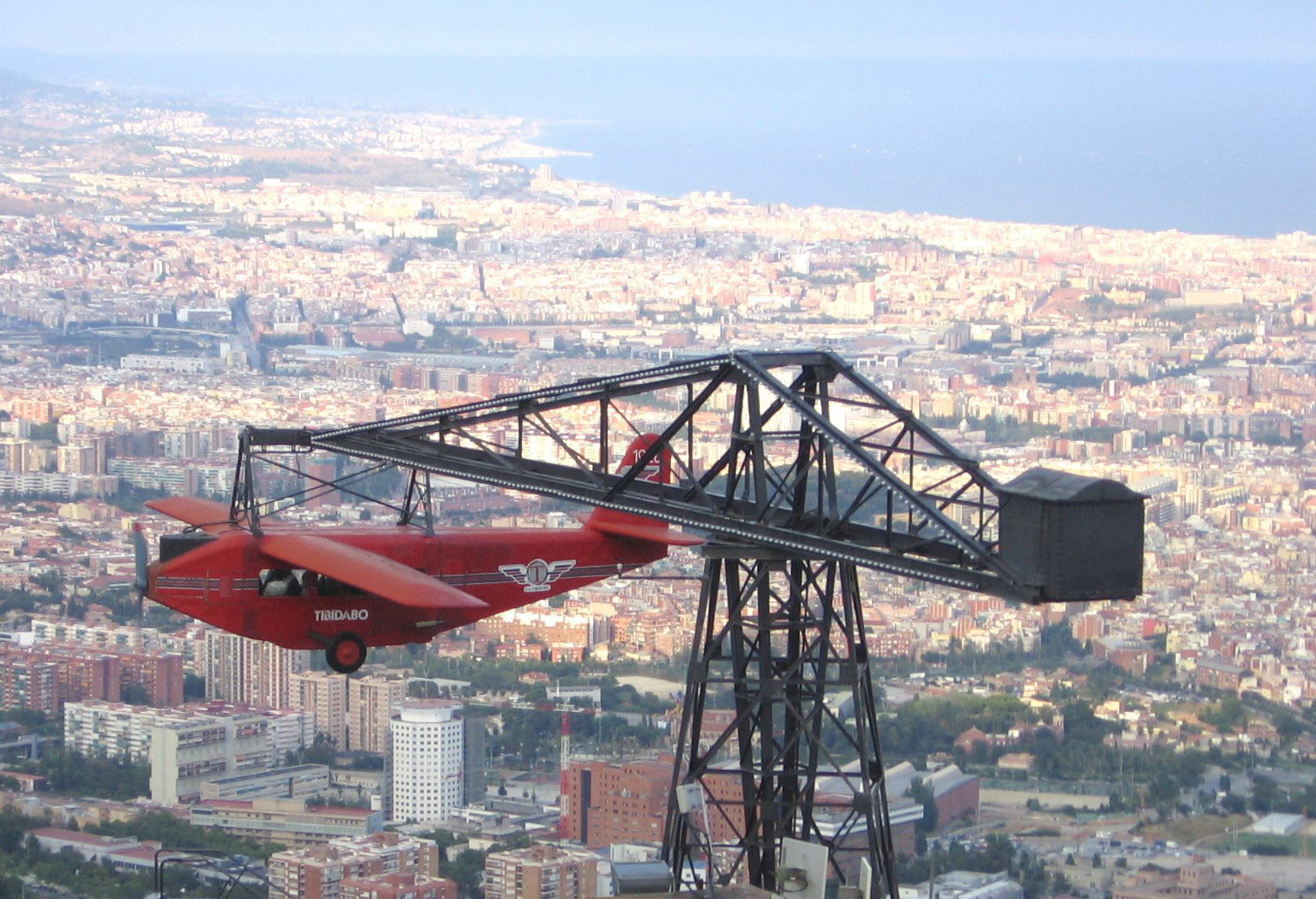
Tibidabo's iconic Avió red airplane

The top level of the park, located 516 metres (1,693 ft) above sea level. This area contains the main entrance and is thus open access.

- Avió; A plane modeling the first commercial aircraft flight from Madrid to Barcelona in 1927. Built in 1928, the attractions consists of the replica plane suspended by a crane, which could move around in a circle and is powered by the plane's propeller. With the vantage point of Barcelona, it is considered the park's star attraction. The Avió underwent a restoration for the 2017 season, in which the plane was detached from its crane for the first time in 87 years to upgrade its appearance. After receiving new paint and lighting, the Avió was ceremoniously reopened in June 2017.
- Carrusel; A Venetian carousel from Bertazzon installed in 1989.
- Giradabo; The park's latest ferris wheel, which was supplied by SBF Visa and opened in 2014, directly replacing the previous Panoràmic ferris wheel.
- Talaia; An observation attraction that carries guests in a pair of buckets to a height of 551 metres (1,808 ft) above sea level, offering a birds-eye view of Barcelona, the Mediterranean, and the Serra de Collserola. It was opened on December 18, 1921, and at the time was the highest accessible point possible at Tibidabo as the Sagrat Cor Church had not yet been completed at the time.
- Kid's attractions; Three children's rides from Zamperla; Tasses Teacups (2000), Rio Grande (2000) and Pony Trek (1990).

=== Level 5 — Somnis ===
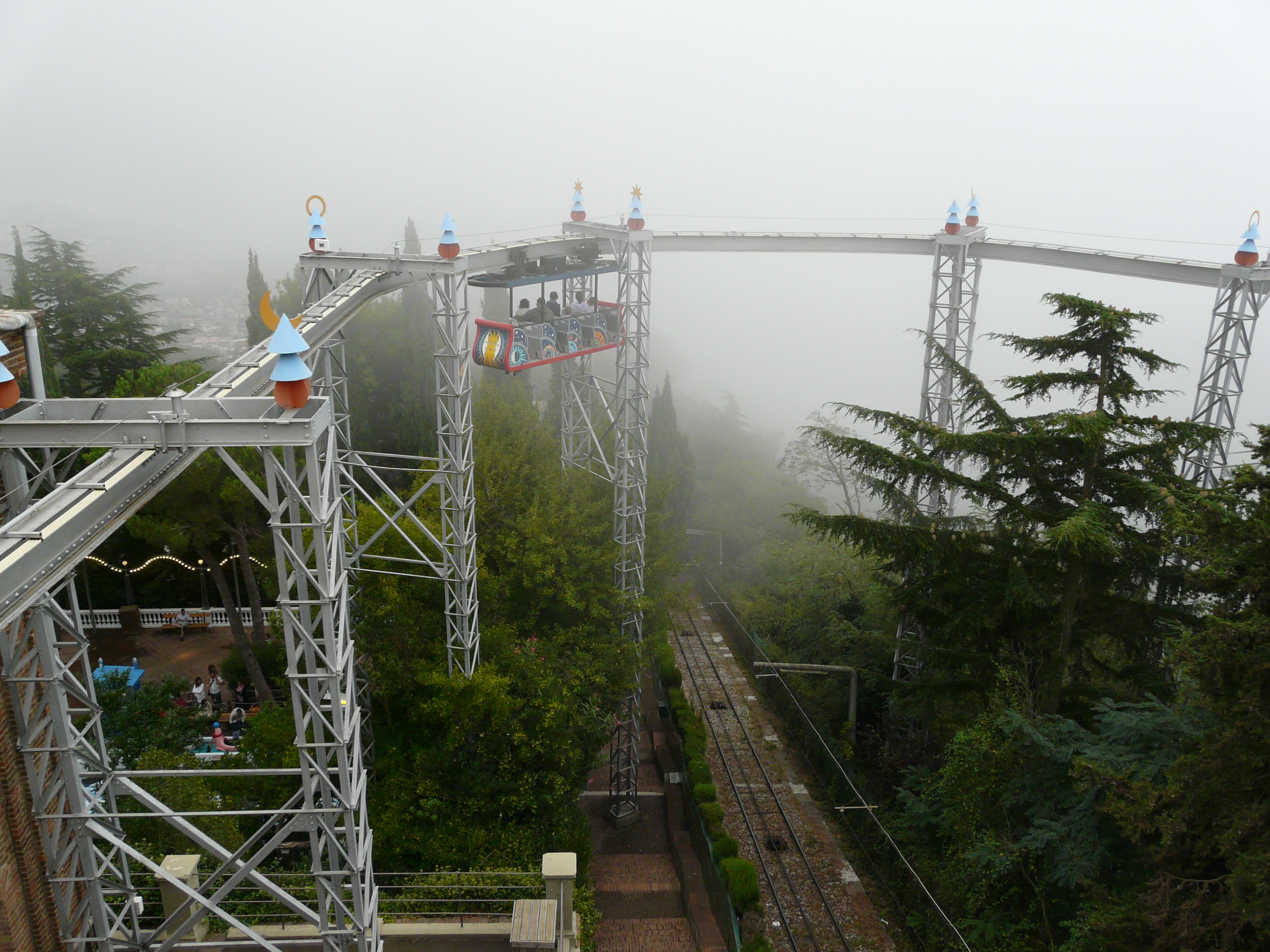
Embruixabruixes suspended monorail

- CreaTibi Robotics; An education space for children offering activities involving Lego Education. The activity was inaugurated in December 2019.
- Embruixabruixes; The park's first major attraction from 1915, a suspended monorail featuring two outdoor sections overlooking the city and various indoor show scenes. Originally opening as Ferrocarril Aéreo, it has been renamed and refurbished several times, with the last major overhaul taking place in 2016. The monorail previously operated with driver-controlled carriages until these became automated in 1991; companies such as Intamin and Lunatus have performed work on the system since then.
- Marionetarium; A puppet theatre and exhibition featuring characters from the Herta Frankel Puppet Company.
- Miramiralls; A traditional house of mirrors.
- Museum of Automats; An exhibition of automaton that has been shown at the park since its inception. Currently, its oldest piece is The Mandolin Clown, dating from 1880. In 1957, Walt Disney – who himself had a love for the park - attempted to buy the museum's entire collection with blank cheques, an offer which the management refused.

=== Level 4 — 666 ===
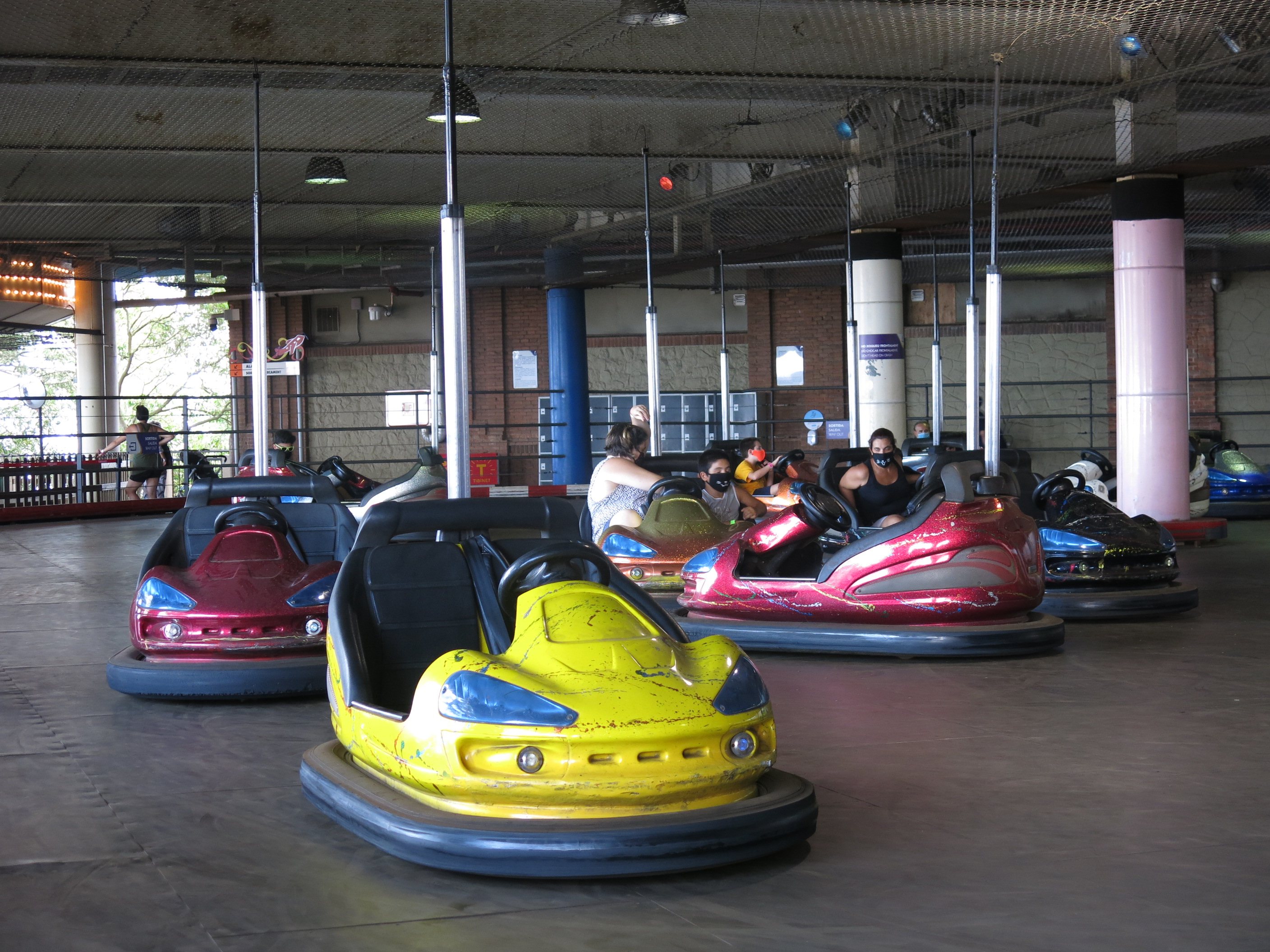
Crash Cars

- Crash Cars; Reverchon bumper cars that opened in 1989.
- Espai 666;
- Hotel 666; A haunted house attraction that took over the Pasaje del Terror walkthrough in 1996. The experience lasts around 10–12 minutes and includes live scare actors.

=== Level 2 — Xerinola ===
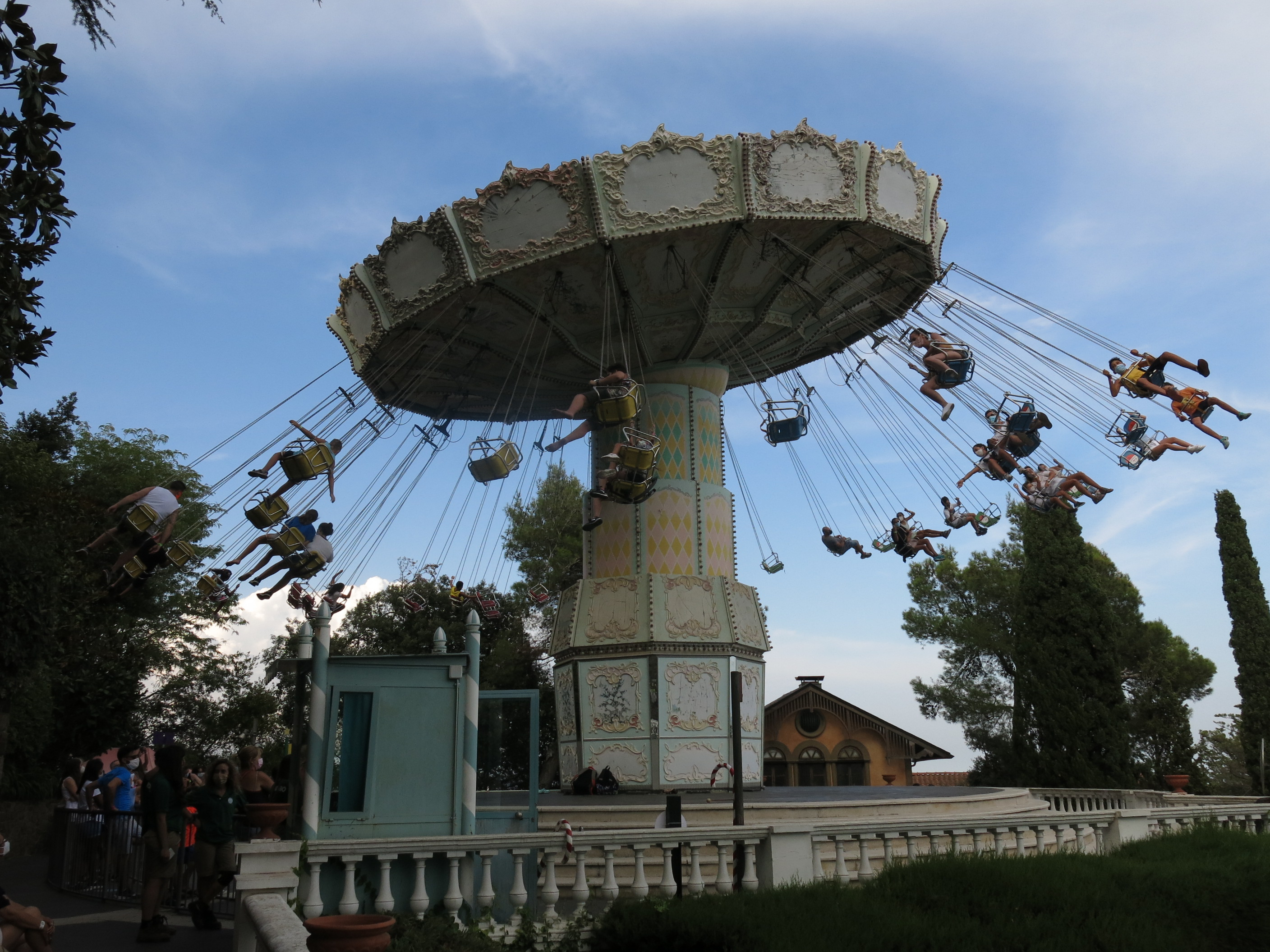
Diàvolo

- Alaska; A junior log flume from Zamperla, which opened in 1990.
- Diavolo; A Zierer wave swinger, which opened in 1989.
- Dididado; A 4D cinema that plays short films.
- Merlí; A 50-metre (160 ft) tall Funtime drop tower which opened in 2024.
- Mini Hurakan; A miniature top spin from SBF Visa, which was installed at the park in 2017.

=== Level 1 ===
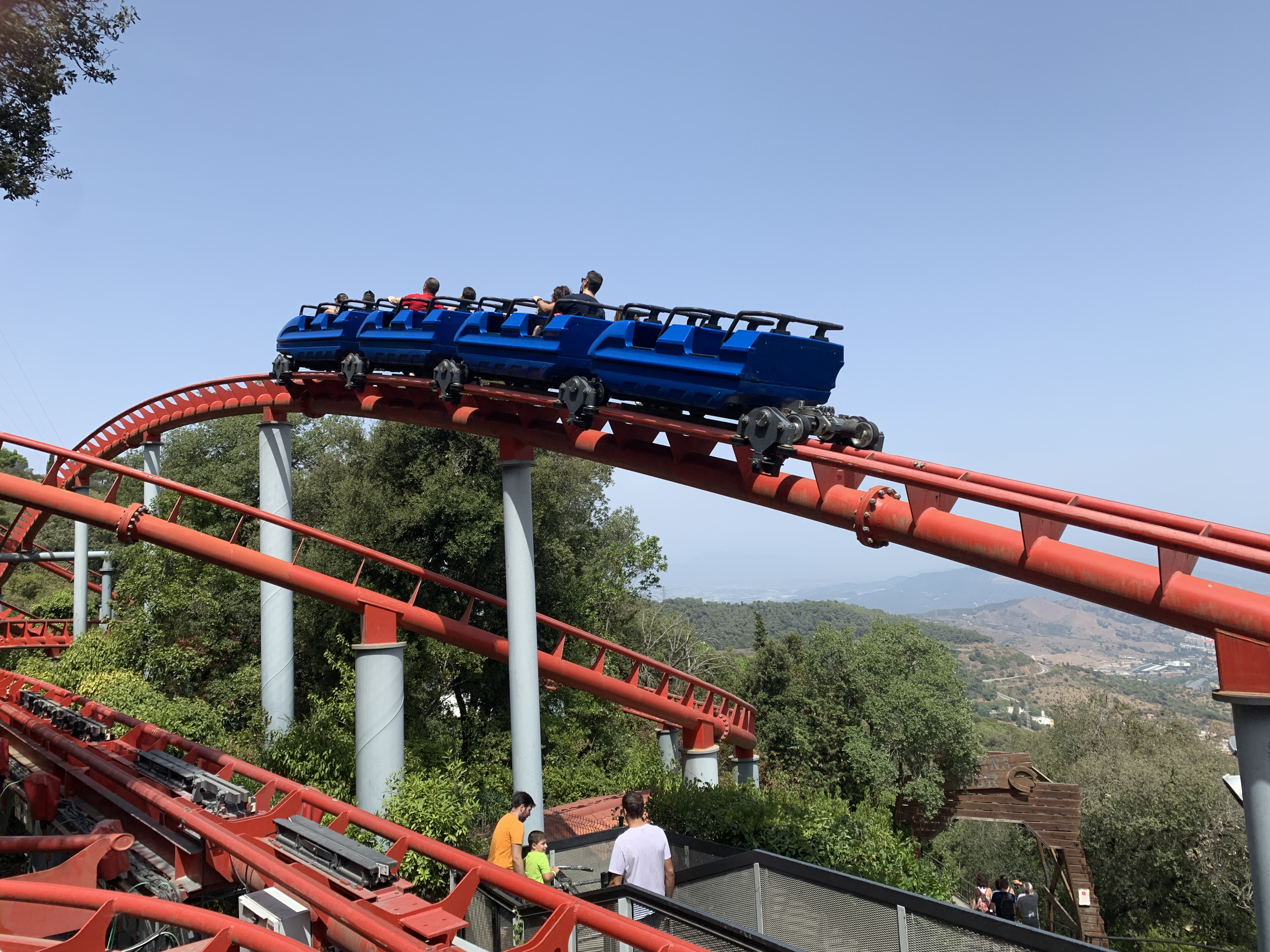
Muntanya Russa

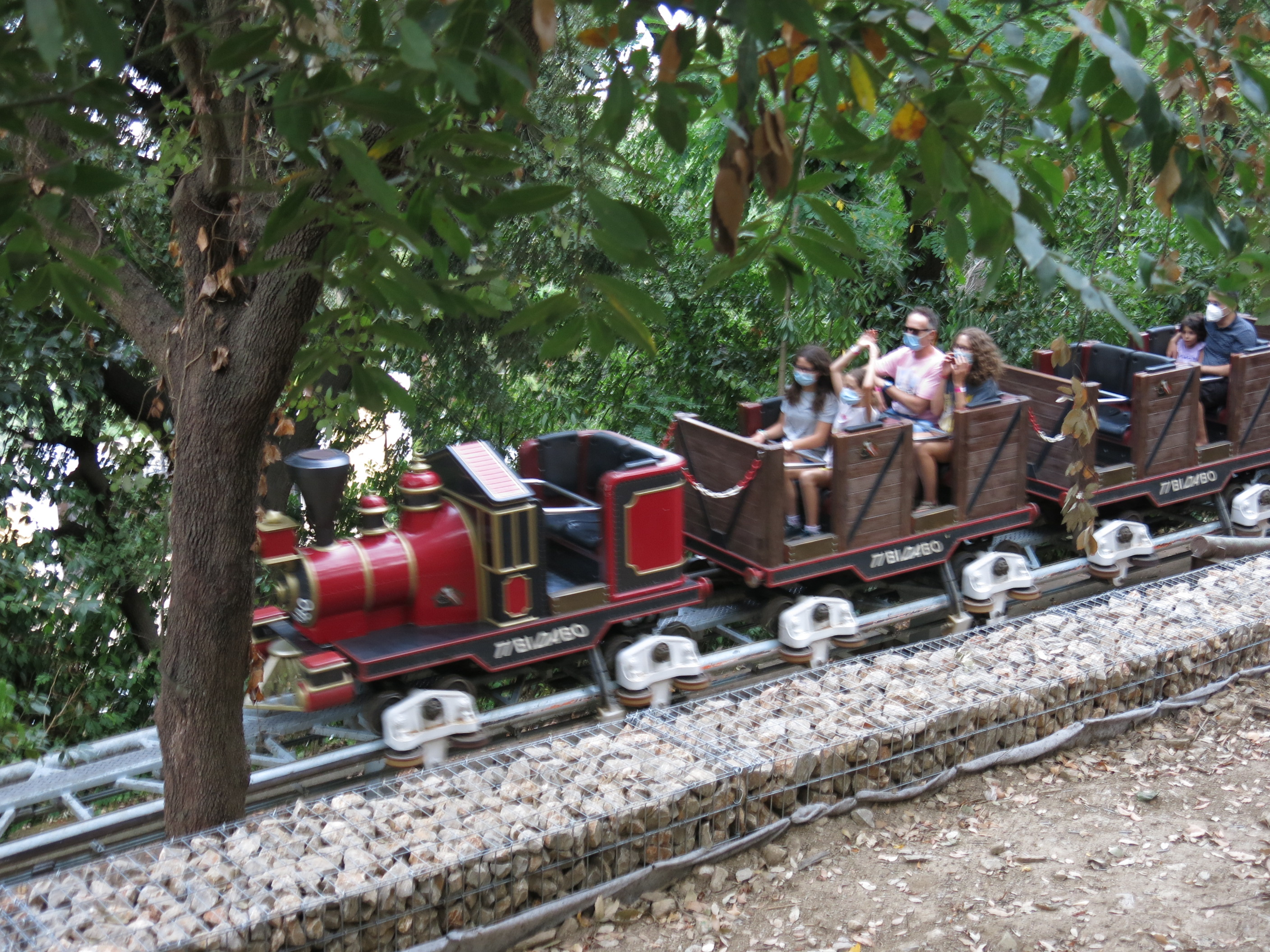
Tibidabo Express

The bottom of the park, which includes most of the park's larger attractions and restaurants.

- Castell dels Contes; A narrative and immersive experience inside an old castle, which was inaugurated in 2018. The attraction is a renovated version of the Castell Misteriós, which was inaugurated in 1955.
- Globus; A 2006 samba balloon ride from Zamperla.
- Granota; A junior drop tower from Zamperla, which opened in 2000.
- Mina d'Or; A 300-metre (980 ft) long log flume with two drops.
- Muntanya Russa; A Vekoma roller coaster and the larger of the park's two coasters.
- Piratta; A Zamperla pirate ship attraction which opened in 1989.
- Tchu Tchu Tren; A junior railway from SBF Visa that replaced an older iteration of the ride in 2017.
- TibiCity; A miniature turnpike for children, in which they can practice driving with smaller electric cars and learn basic driving mobility. The attraction was inaugurated in March 2015.
- Tibidabo Express; A powered roller coaster from Zamperla that opened in 1990, which makes a lap around part of the lower level and includes a tunnel. In 2017, the park began offering a virtual reality experience on the coaster using headsets and a "film" from MackMedia – this is an adapted version of the Das Geheimnis von Schloss Balthasar movie offered on Alpenexpress Enzian at Europa-Park, also operated and designed by the Mack family.

== Former attractions ==
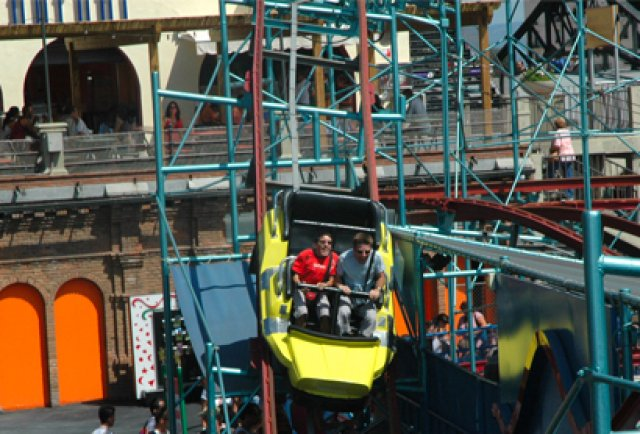
Montaña Rusa (1961 - 2009)

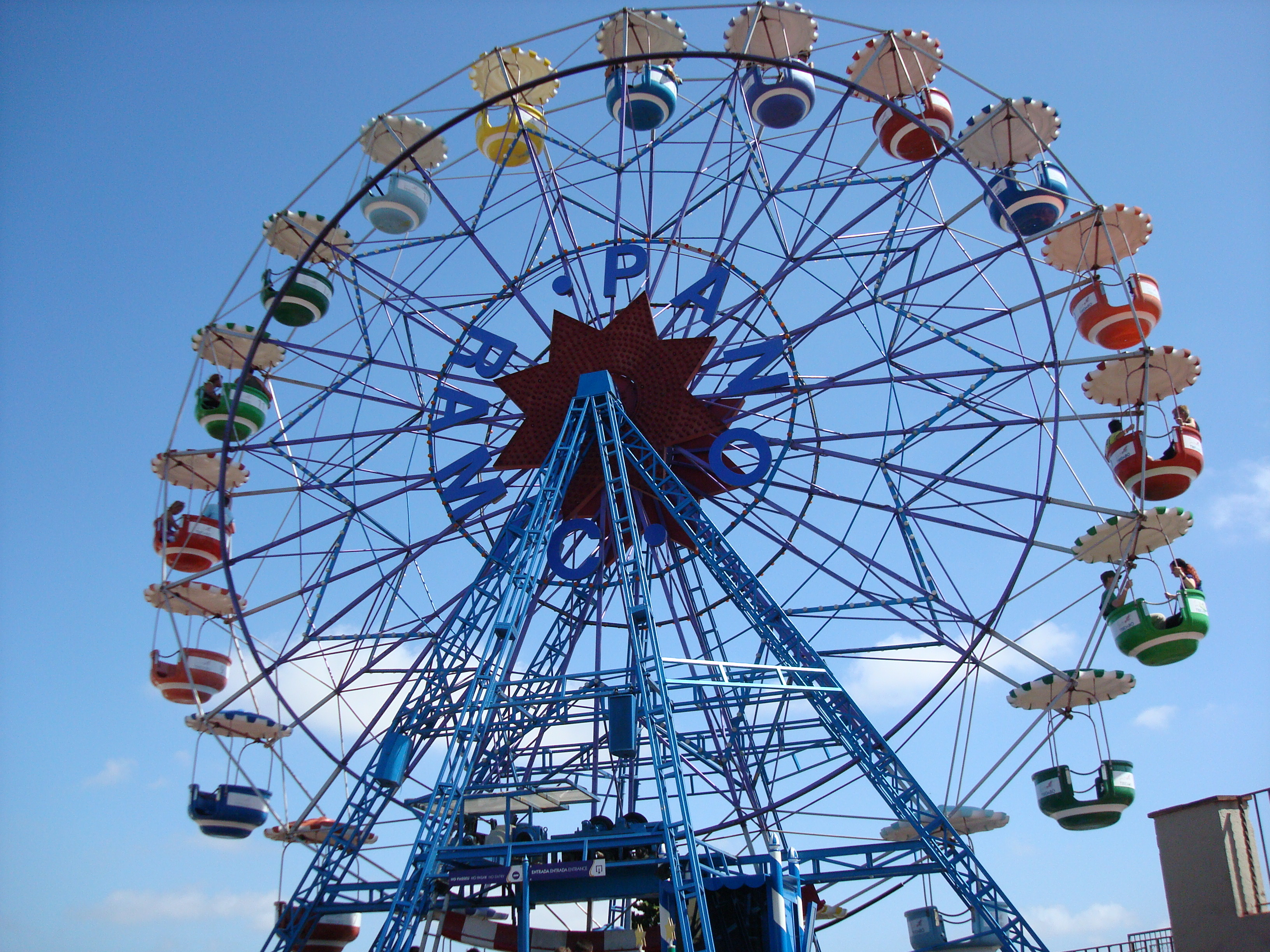
Panorámic (1983 - 2010)

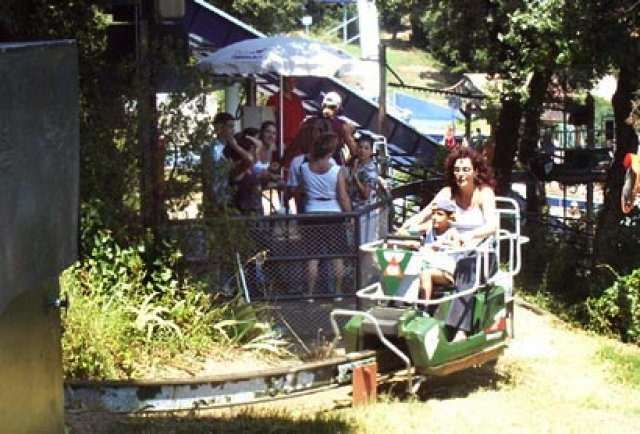
Transmòbil (1980 - 2008)

- Aladdino; A rainbow attraction from Zamperla, one of many removed from European parks following the collapse of Liseberg's ride the year prior (1989–2009).
- Autos de Xoc; A vintage bumper car arena that opened in 1963 and preceded the Crash Cars.
- Hurakan; A HUSS top spin that was retired due to old age and growing mechanical issues, being dismantled in 2021 and eventually replaced by Merlí (1992–2019).
- "Mega Drop"; A Fabbri drop tower that was temporarily installed on the park's bottom level between 2004 and 2005. Its site has since been occupied by the Globus balloon ride.
- Montaña Rusa; The park's original roller coaster, a Zyklon layout which was retired after the newer Muntanya Russa opened and its site is currently taken up by the Plaça dels Somnis (Square of Dreams) event space (1961 - 2009).
- Panorámic; Originally known as La Sínia, it was a ferris wheel designed by Bernal Toledano that was replaced by the current Giradabo (1983–2010).
- Pasaje del Terror; The park's original haunted experience, which was eventually converted into the Hotel Krüeger (1990–1995).
- Pèndol; A Fabbri air diver thrill ride that was removed following a fatal collapse, and has since been replaced by TibiCity (2006–2010).
- Roda Panoràmica; The park's second ferris wheel, which was replaced by La Sínia/Panorámic (1962–1982).
- Transmòbil; A single/double passenger monorail coaster that transported riders from the top of the park to the bottom, which was removed to make way for the Muntanya Russa (1980–2008).

== 2010 El Pèndulo accident ==
On July 10, 2010, a 15-year-old girl died and three others were injured after the mechanical arm of the El Pèndulo ride broke and caused the structure to collapse. The ride fell on top of the Mina d'Or, destroying part of the attraction. Barcelona City Council stated that the El Pèndulo had passed all inspections, but later admitted that they'd recorded faults with the ride's braking system and axle over the four years since its installation in 2006. A report was commissioned from the Barcelona School of Industrial Engineering, attributing the breakdown to issues with the manufacturing and installation of the ride, while an investigation determined that there had been a chain of errors with the ride's design, manufacturing, construction, and commissioning.
