= Josep Grau-Garriga =

Catalan textile artist

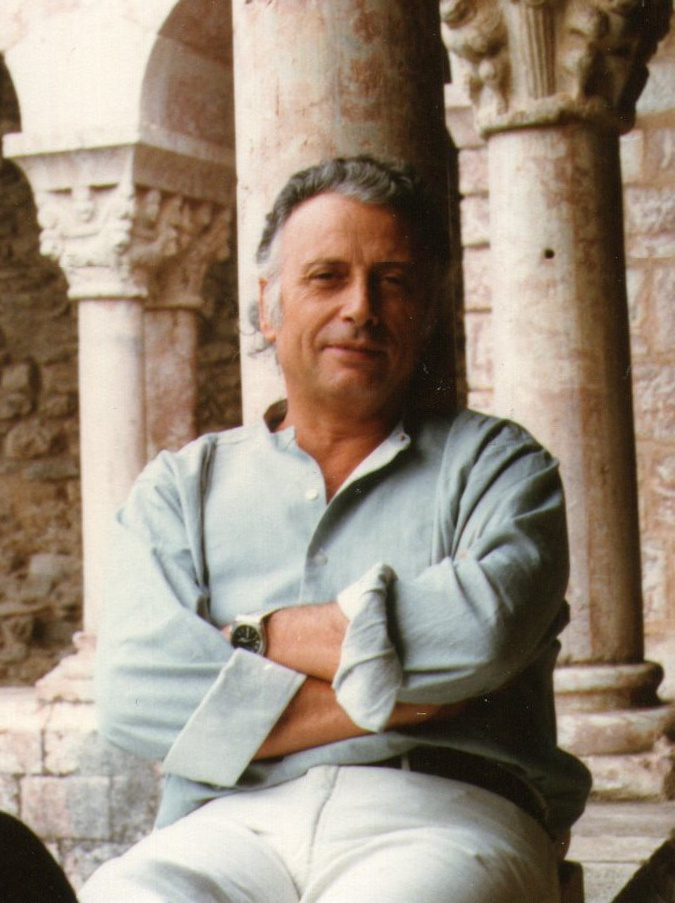
Josep Grau-Garriga

Josep Grau-Garriga (February 18, 1929 - August 29, 2011) was a Catalan textile artist who cultivated various techniques: painting, drawing, engraving, wall painting, sculpture and above all tapestry. He was the director of the Escola Catalana del Tapís (Catalan School of Tapestry) and exhibited his works around the world. He was born in Sant Cugat del Vallès and died in Angers, Pays del Loire.

== Exhibitions ==
- 1964. Sala Gaspar. Barcelona
- 1967. General Directorate Exhibition Hall of Fine Arts. Madrid
- 1968. Sala F. Domingo. São Paulo (Brazil)
- 1968/1969/1970/1972/1975. La Demeure Gallery. Paris
- 1970. The Córdoba Museum. Lincoln. Massachusetts. (US)
- 1970. The Houston Fine Arts Museum. Houston. (US)
- 1971/75. The Birmingham Museum of Fine Arts. Birmingham. (US)
- 1971/73/74/77/83. Arras Gallery. New York (US)
- 1972. Casa de la Vall. Andorra la Vella (Andorra)
- 1972. Antonana Gallery. Caracas (Venezuela)
- 1973. René Metrás Gallery. Barcelona
- 1973. Textile Museum. Terrassa
- 1973. Old Hospital of the Holy Cross. Barcelona
- 1974. Los Angeles Country Museum. Los Angeles. (US)
- 1979. Febo Gallery. Sant Cugat del Vallès
- 1979. Fucares Gallery. Almagro (Spain)
- 1981. UNESCO Palace. Paris
- 1982/85. Cloisters of the Royal Monastery. Sant Cugat del Vallès
- 1982. Carcassonne (France)
- 1987. Rufino Tamayo Museum. Mexico D.F
- 1988. Palau Robert. Barcelona
- 1989. Jean Lurçat Museum. Angers (France)
- 1990. Museum of History. Sabadell
- 1990/96/99. Canals, Art Gallery. San Cugat
- 1992. Can Mulà Cultural Center. Mollet del Vallès
- 1992. Punto Gallery. Valencia
- 1992. Franciscan Cultural Center of Abidja. Abidja (Ivory Coast)
- 1993. Temple Romà. Vic
- 1999. Benassar Gallery. Madrid
- 1999. Blanquerna Gallery. Madrid
- 1999. Canals Art Gallery, Sant Cugat
- 1999. Galerie Xavier Delannoy, La Garde-Freinet (French)
- 2002. Abbaye de Ronceray and Musée Jean Lurçat d'Angers, Angers (France)
- 2009. Abbey of Saint-Florent-le-Vieil (France).
- 2010. Musée des Beaux-Arts d'Angers, Cabinet d'arts graphiques, Angers (France)
- 2015. Michel Soskine Inc., Madrid.
- 2022- MACBA Museum, Barcelona
