= Hermitage of Sant Adjutori =

Coordinates: 41°27′20″N 2°06′51″E

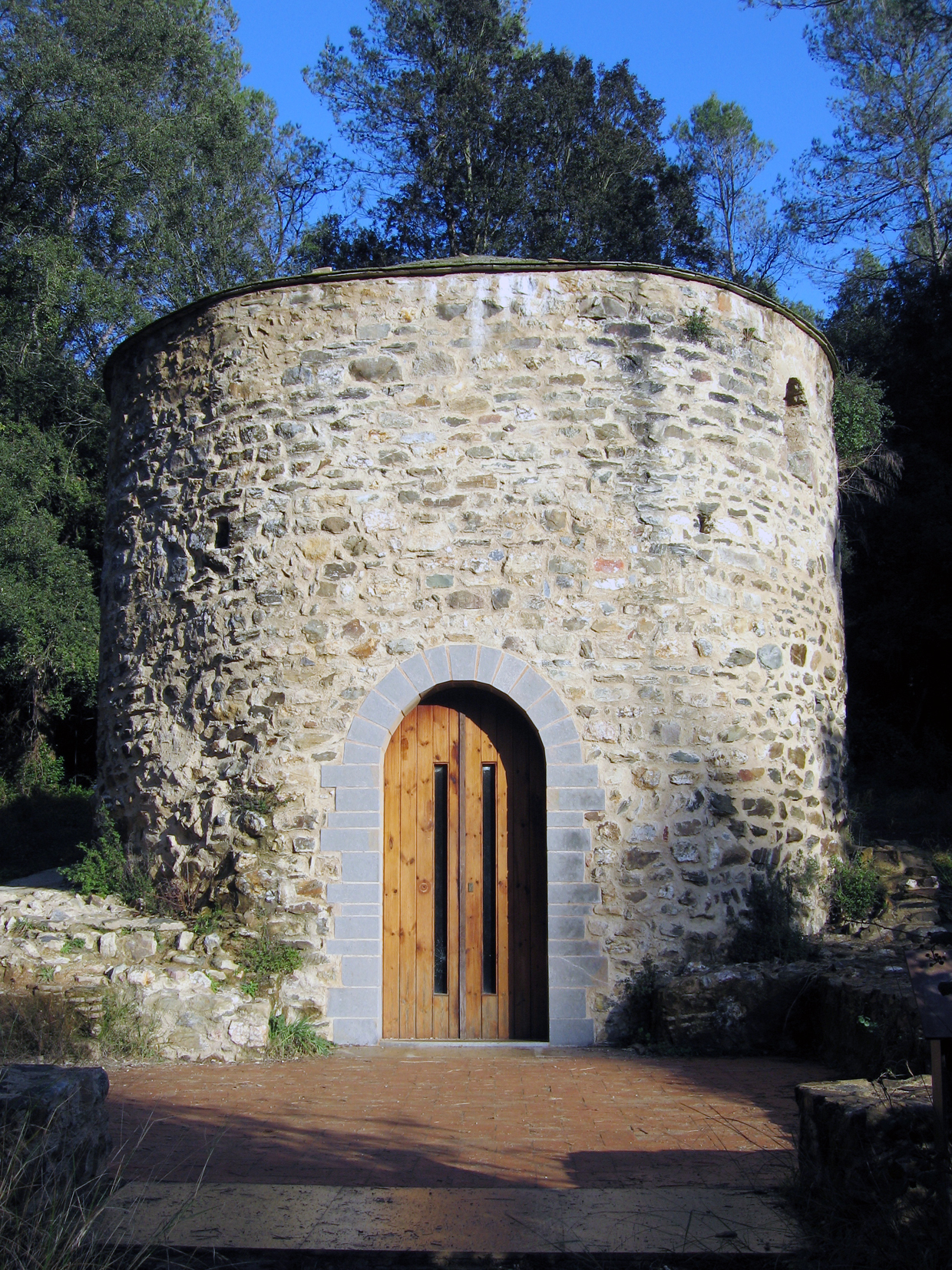
Hermitage of Sant Adjutori in Sant Cugat del Vallès

The Hermitage of Sant Adjutori is a 10th-century Romanesque church in the municipality of Sant Cugat del Vallès, Vallès Occidental, Spain. It has undergone reforms and expansions in the 12th, 16th, and 17th centuries. It is located in the Gausac valley, very close to the Can Borrell farmhouse. It is part of the Inventory of Architectural Heritage of Catalonia.

This is a hermitage with a circular floor plan and a hemispherical vault. It has a window with a dressed stone arch. Three levels can be distinguished: the lower one is pre-Romanesque, and the remaining two are Romanesque. Below the current level, there is an older foundation built using the opus spicatum technique. The altar is located on the east side, according to the old tradition. The entrance door shows evidence of reforms throughout the ages. Right on the edge is the Iberian Forno, which dates from the Late Roman Republican period (2nd and 1st centuries BC). Both monuments have been declared a cultural asset of local interest, forming part of the Architectural Heritage Catalog of Sant Cugat del Vallès.

A hermitage that was part of a retreat for the abbots of Sant Cugat. The first date is from 962; the hermitage was part of the monastery's properties. It was of great importance for many years because a large population center had formed in the valley during the High Middle Ages. The worship continued until the 19th century, and due to the Desamortización of 1835, the chapel was abandoned.
