= Monastery of Sant Cugat =

Benedictine abbey in Sant Cugat del Vallès, Catalonia, Spain

Coordinates: 41°28′25″N 2°5′6″E

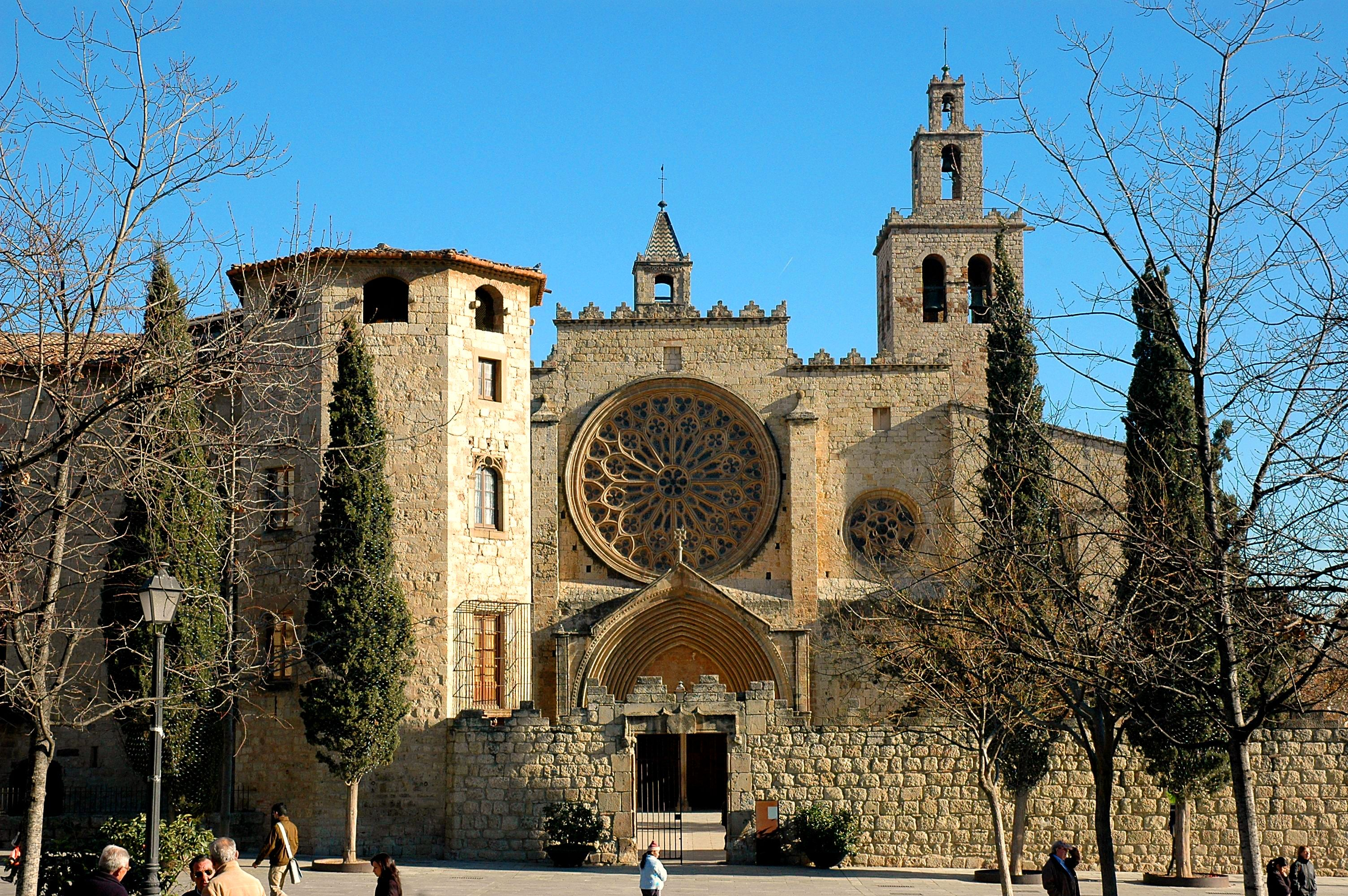
Façade of the monastery.

The Monastery of Sant Cugat (Catalan: Monestir de Sant Cugat, Spanish: Monasterio de San Cugat del Vallés) is a Benedictine abbey in Sant Cugat del Vallès, Catalonia, Spain. Founded in the ninth century, and under construction until the 14th century, it was the most important monastery in the county of Barcelona. Its most notable architectural feature is its large Romanesque cloister.

== History ==
The monastery's origins date back to the ninth century, when it was decided to unite the fifth century church housing the remains of St. Cucuphas (Catalan: Sant Cugat) with an annexed fortification. In the year 985, the monastery was severely damaged during the sack of Barcelona by Muslim troops led by al-Mansur Ibn Abi Aamir. The Abbot Joan and twelve monks were killed, and the archives were destroyed. The monastery was subsequently rebuilt and expanded by Abbot Odó from 986 onwards.

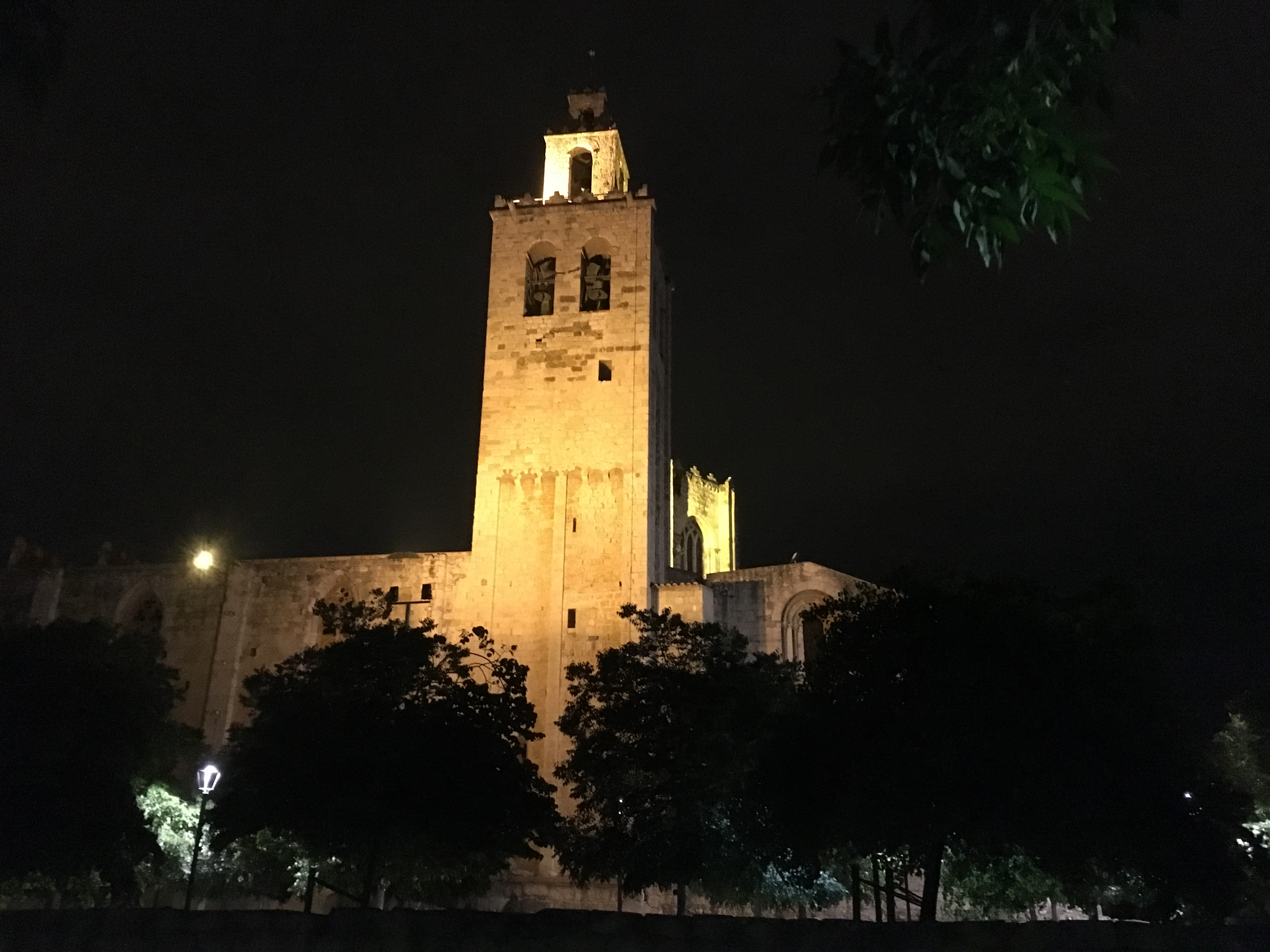
Monastery of Sant Cugat lit at night

In the late 11th century, count Ramon Berenguer II of Barcelona decreed that the monastery would be subject to St Ponce de Tomieres (Saint-Pons-de-Thomières), in the Languedoc, creating turmoil amongst the monks of Sant Cugat. The abbot of St. Ponce moved to the monastery and the monks who disagreed with his administration were expelled. However, the bishop of Barcelona claimed his rights over the monastery, which was returned to the diocese of Barcelona. At the time, Sant Cugat was controlling the monasteries of Santa Cecília de Montserrat, Sant Llorenç del Munt, Sant Pau del Camp, Sant Pere de Clará and Sant Salvador de Breda.

In the mid-12th century, the construction of a new monastery was begun. It was finished in 1337. In 1350, work began on the fortifications. During the War of Spanish Succession, it was occupied by troops of Archduke Charles, causing damage to the structure. Restoration work was completed in 1789.

In 1835, the monastery was abandoned by the monks, remaining empty until 1851, when restoration began. It was declared a National Monument in 1931.

== Architecture and fittings ==
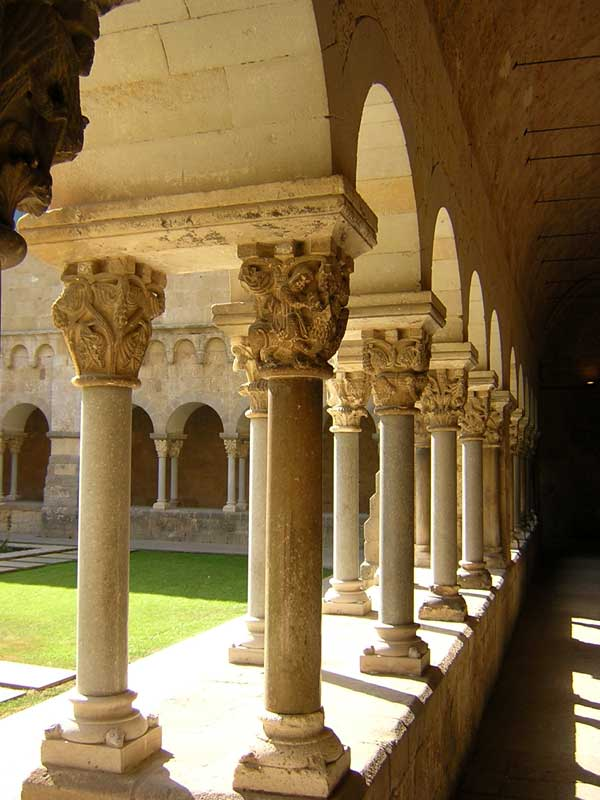
View of the cloister.

The most distinctive feature of the monastery is its cloister, a notable example of Romanesque art, dating to the 12th century. In the 16th century a second floor was added, as well as an atrium and the entrance.

With a length of more than 30 metres, the cloister was designed by Arnau Cadell and his disciple Lluís Samaranch. It has a square plan with semicircular arches, supported by pairs of columns. Each of the latter has a finely decorated capital, with various details ranging from animals to biblical scenes.

Though the cloister is Romanesque, the church is built in the Gothic style, having a nave and two aisles. The façade has a large (8.2 diameter) rose window, similar to those in the Cathedrals of Barcelona and of Tarragona. The church houses a Gothic altarpiece, known as the retaule de Tots els Sants, made in 1375 by Pere Serra.

== See also ==
- Sant Cugat Museum
- High medieval domes

== Bibliography ==
- Tomàs Bonell, Jordi (1994). Descobrir Catalunya. Barcelona: Premsa Catalana.
