= Sant Cugat del Vallès =

- Municipality
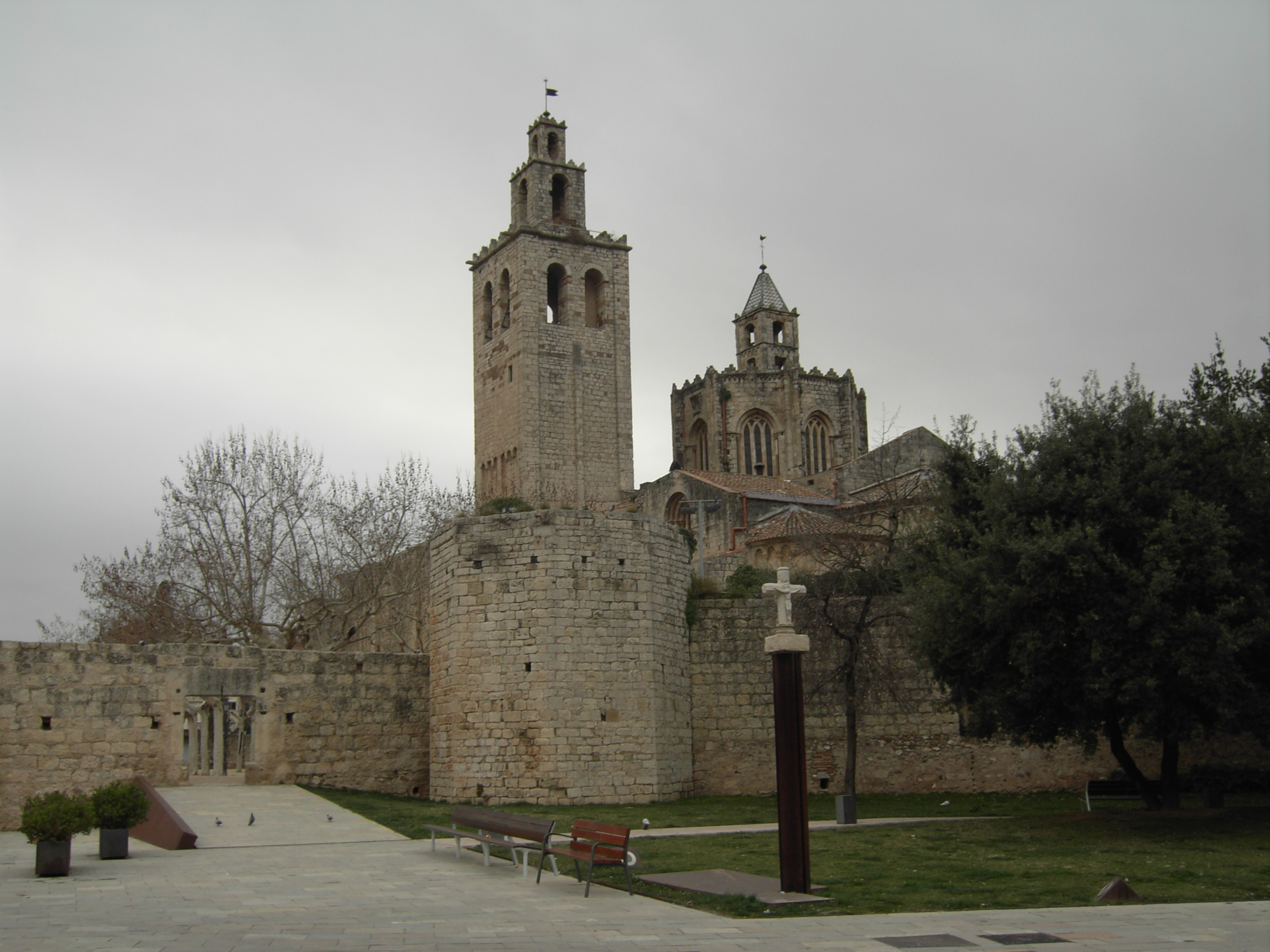
- San Cugat del Vallès monastery

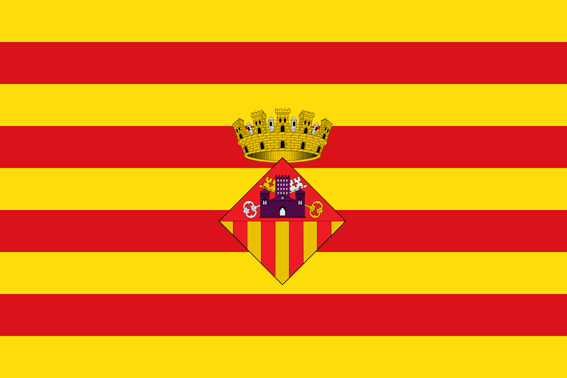
- Flag Coat of arms

- Location in the Province of Barcelona Location in Catalonia Location in Spain
- Coordinates: 41°28′N 2°05′E
- Country: Spain
- Community: Catalonia
- Province: Barcelona
- Comarca: Vallès Occidental

Government
  - Mayor: Josep Maria Vallès (Junts)

Area
  - Total: 48.2 km^{2} (18.6 sq mi)
- Elevation: 124 m (407 ft)

Population (2025-01-01)
  - Total: 97,983
  - Density: 2,030/km^{2} (5,270/sq mi)
- Demonym: Santcugatenc
- Postal code: 08172-08174
- Website: santcugat.cat

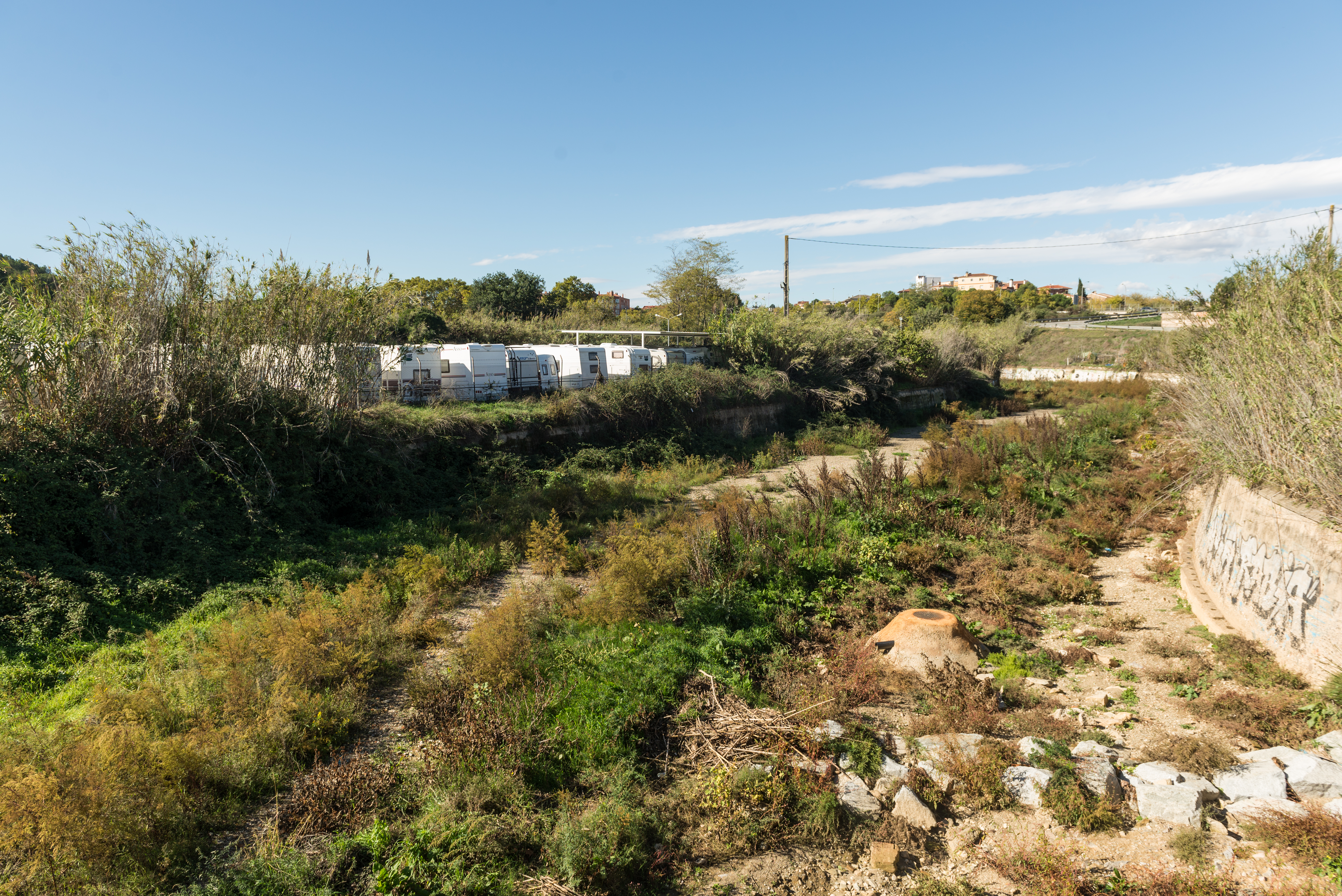
Riu de Sant Cugat

Sant Cugat del Vallès (Catalan pronunciation: [ˌsaŋ kuˈɣad dəl βəˈʎɛs]) is a city and municipality 10 km northwest of Barcelona, Catalonia, Spain, on the other side of the Collserola forest.

With a population of 97,983 (INE 2025) and a population density of 2,041 people per square kilometer, it is the third most populous municipality in the Vallès Occidental, after Terrassa and Sabadell (the two regional capitals) and the eighth most populous in the province of Barcelona.

Known as Castrum Octavianum in antiquity (which means the castle of Octavianus) and as Pins del Vallès during the Second Spanish Republic, it is named after Saint Cucuphas, who is said to have been martyred on the spot now occupied by its medieval monastery. The final part of its toponym, del Vallès, is a reference to the county where the town is situated, Vallès.

== Description ==
In addition to the monastery, the town's other notable buildings include the School of Architecture of the Vallès and the Centre d'Alt Rendiment (CAR, translit. High Performance Centre), a famous centre for professional sports training.

Sant Cugat has become an affluent suburb of Barcelona due to its location (only 10 kilometres from the city), its natural surroundings, and its pedestrian shopping area. Sant Cugat also offers restaurants, a concert venue, two cinemas, and one large shopping centre. It is also a political stronghold for conservative Catalan nationalism, with Convergència i Unió dominating the town's politics for 32 years up until 2019 when the Republican Left of Catalonia took control of the City Council with the support of other political forces (PSC and CUP).

It had a population of 97,983 inhabitants in 2025 and is the third most populous municipality in Vallès Occidental, after Terrassa and Sabadell, the two county capitals, as well as the eighth most populous in the province of Barcelona. It has also practically merged with the nearby towns of Rubí (population 72,987) and Cerdanyola del Vallès (population 58,747).

The town has 6 train stations: a direct fast-train connection through Ferrocarils into Barcelona city centre and the nearby industrial cities of Terrassa and Sabadell and a Renfe station. By car, there are the highway AP-7 connecting it to Girona and Tarragona; the scenic Mountain road Rabassada, crossing the Tibidabo to Barcelona and the Vallvidrera Tunnels providing easy access to the center of Barcelona.

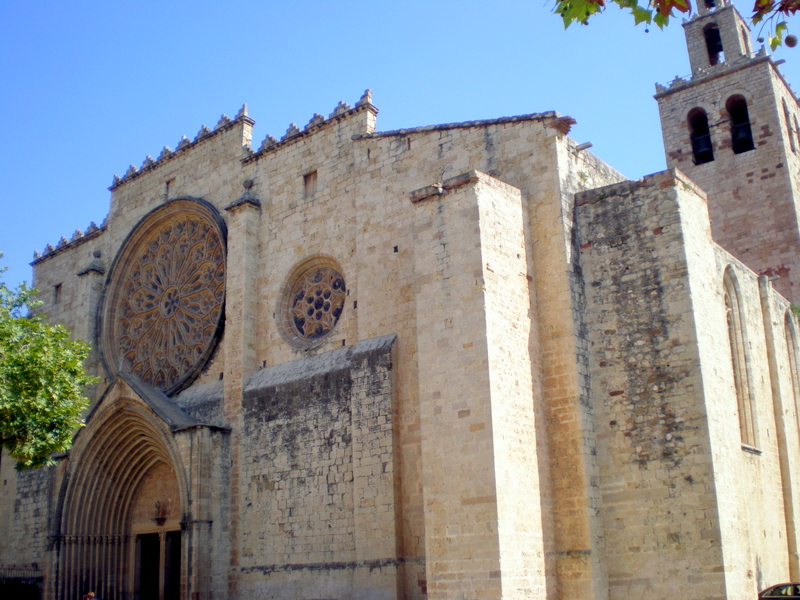
Monastery of Sant Cugat

== Main sights ==
These are some of the main sights of the municipality:

- Monastery of Sant Cugat
- Hermitage of Sant Medir (10th century)
- Hermitage of Sant Adjutori (10th century)
- Torre Negra (12th century)
- Gothic bridge of Can Vernet (14th century)
- Casa Armet

== Demography ==
Sant Cugat del Vallès is made up of five districts: Sant Cugat center, Mirasol with 14,474 inhabitants, Valldoreix which has a population of 8,272, La Floresta with 4,553 inhabitants and Les Planes which is inhabited by 1,290 people.

This table below shows the population of the municipality over the 20th century and the early 21st century.

1900	1930	1950	1970	1986	2014
2,120	5,190	6,992	20,490	35,302	87,118

=== Districts ===
San Cugat del Vallès comprises five districts: San Cugat town centre, Mirasol, Valldoreix, La Floresta and Les Planes. The district of Les Planes is divided into two parts: one belongs to Sant Cugat and the other to Barcelona, specifically the Sarriá-Sant Gervasi district.

Population by district
Districts	Population (2024)
Núcli Urbá	65,498
Mirasol	17,767
Les Planes	1454
La Floresta	5005
Valldoreix	8925

== Government ==
The National Archive of Catalonia is in the commune.

== Education ==
The main public secondary schools in Sant Cugat are IES Angeleta Ferrer i Sensat de Sant Cugat, the Institut Joaquima Pla i Farreras and Institut Arnau Cadell. There are many private and international schools in the city, such as the Agora Sant Cugat International School.

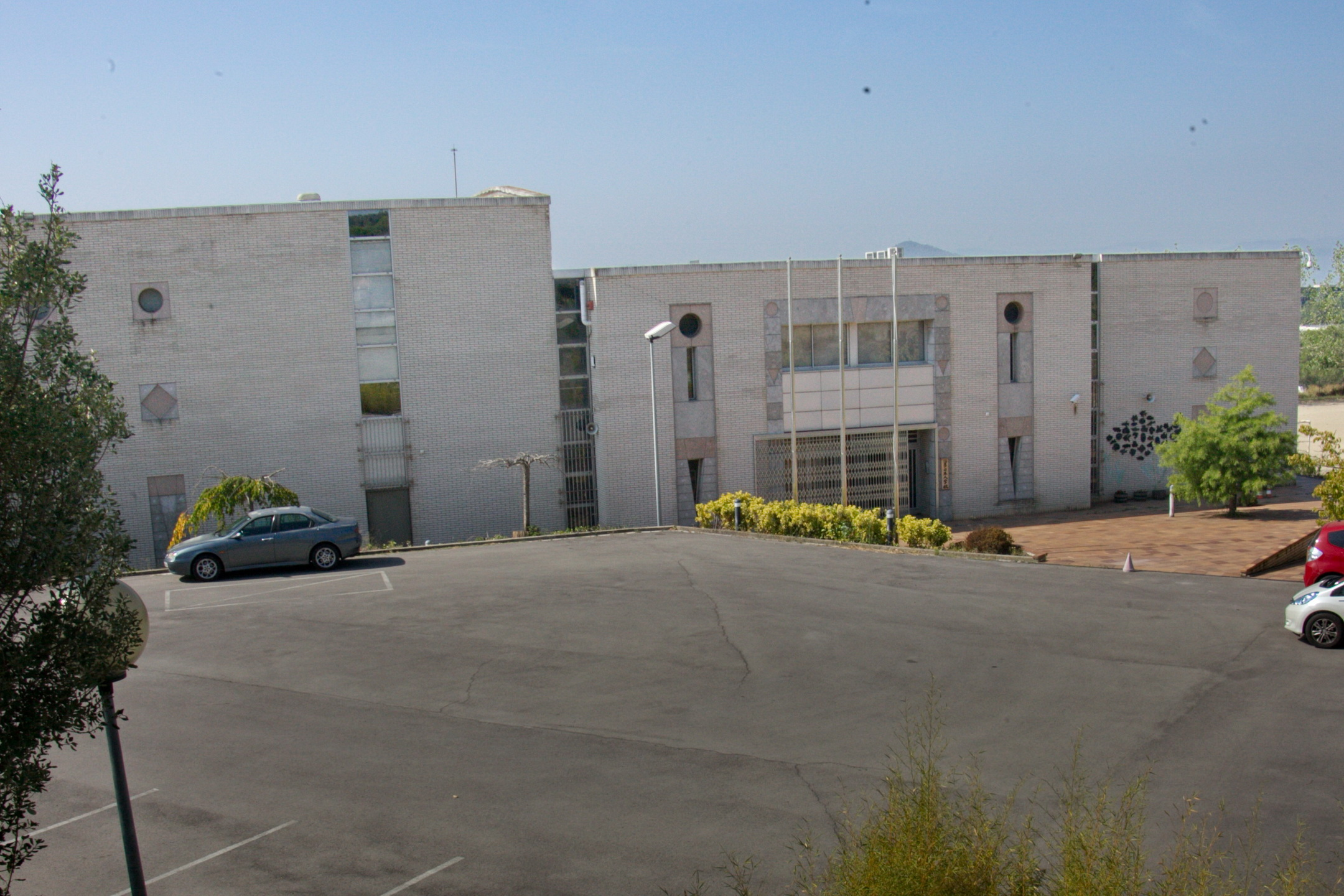
Japanese School in Barcelona

The Japanese School in Barcelona, a Japanese international school, is located in the commune. The Hoshuko Barcelona Educación Japonesa/Escuela de Educación Japonesa en Barcelona (バルセロナ補習校 Baruserona Hoshūkō), a weekend supplementary Japanese school, holds its classes in the Japanese School of Barcelona building.

The European International School of Barcelona (IES) is an international school focusing on international languages from outside Spain. Some of the most popular languages studied there are English, French and Chinese.

The Hativka School is a Jewish, multilingual school founded in 1972 and offering multicultural education in Hebrew, English, Catalan and Spanish.

== Culture ==
A number of entities and clubs that promote traditional Catalan Culture exist. Among them,

- A sardana club (Entitat Sardanista de Sant Cugat) that promotes this popular Catalan dance.
- A castellers club was formed in 1996.
- A diables club was formed in 1990.
- A geganters club.

Moreover, Sant Cugat is home to several museums, including the Museu de Sant Cugat, located at the Monastery, centered on the history of the city.

== Economy ==
Sant Cugat is home to major companies such as TVE Cataluña, Banco Sabadell, Hewlett-Packard, Catalana Occidente, as well as a number of pharmaceutical firms like Boehringer Ingelheim, Ferrer, and Hoffmann-La Roche, as well as the corporate headquarters of Grifols. There are several business parks such as Can Sant Joan, Can Magí and Can Calopa, helping Sant Cugat to boast a business ecosystem comprising 2,700 companies and providing over 50,000 jobs.

== Sister cities ==
- El Argoub, Western Sahara
- Alba, Italy
- La Haba, Spain

== See also ==
- Casa Lluch
- Generalife

== Sources ==
- Panareda Clopés, Josep Maria; Rios Calvet, Jaume; Rabella Vives, Josep Maria (1989). Guia de Catalunya, Barcelona: Caixa de Catalunya; ISBN 84-87135-01-3 (Spanish); ISBN 84-87135-02-1 (Catalan).
