= 2007 Extremaduran regional election =

Election in the Spanish region of Extremadura

- 27 May 2007

All 65 seats in the Assembly of Extremadura 33 seats needed for a majority
- Opinion polls
- Registered: 893,547 ▲1.4%
- Turnout: 669,752 (75.0%) ▼0.6 pp
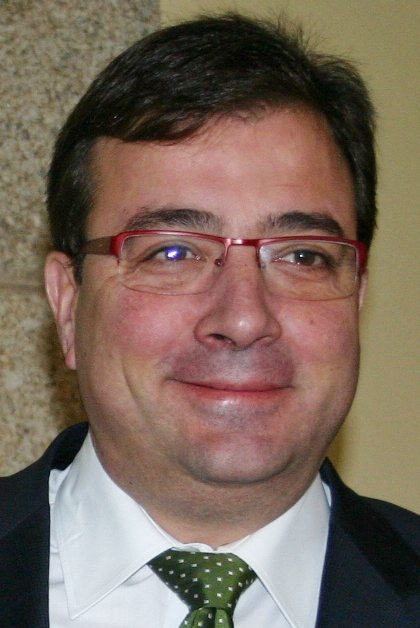

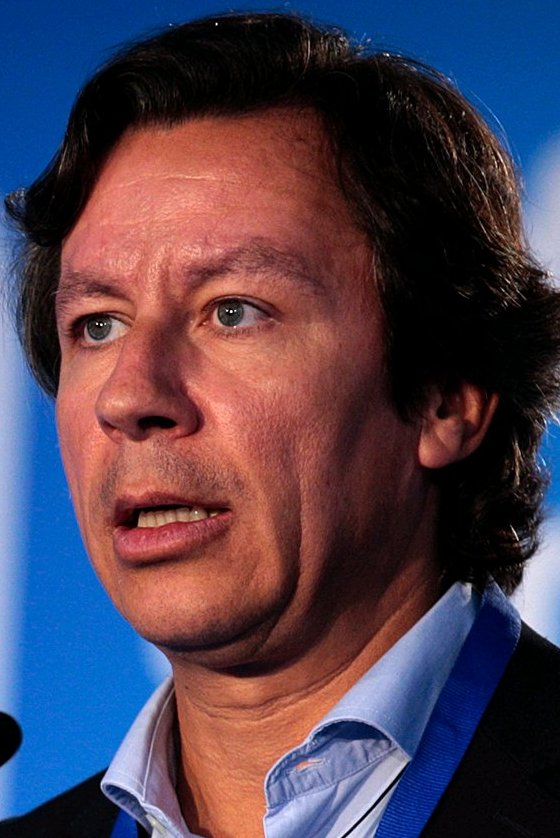

	First party	Second party	Third party
Leader	Guillermo Fernández Vara	Carlos Floriano	Víctor Casco
Party	PSOE–r	PP–EU	IU–SIEx
Leader since	20 September 2006	13 October 2000	30 November 2003
Leader's seat	Badajoz	Cáceres	Cáceres (lost)
Last election	36 seats, 51.7%	26 seats, 40.5% (Note: Results for PP (38.7%, 26 seats) and EU (1.8%, 0 seats) in the 2003 election.)	3 seats, 6.3%
Seats won	38	27	0
Seat change	▲2	▲1	▼3
Popular vote	352,342	257,392	41,448
Percentage	53.0%	38.7%	4.5%
Swing	▲1.3 pp	▼1.8 pp	▼1.8 pp
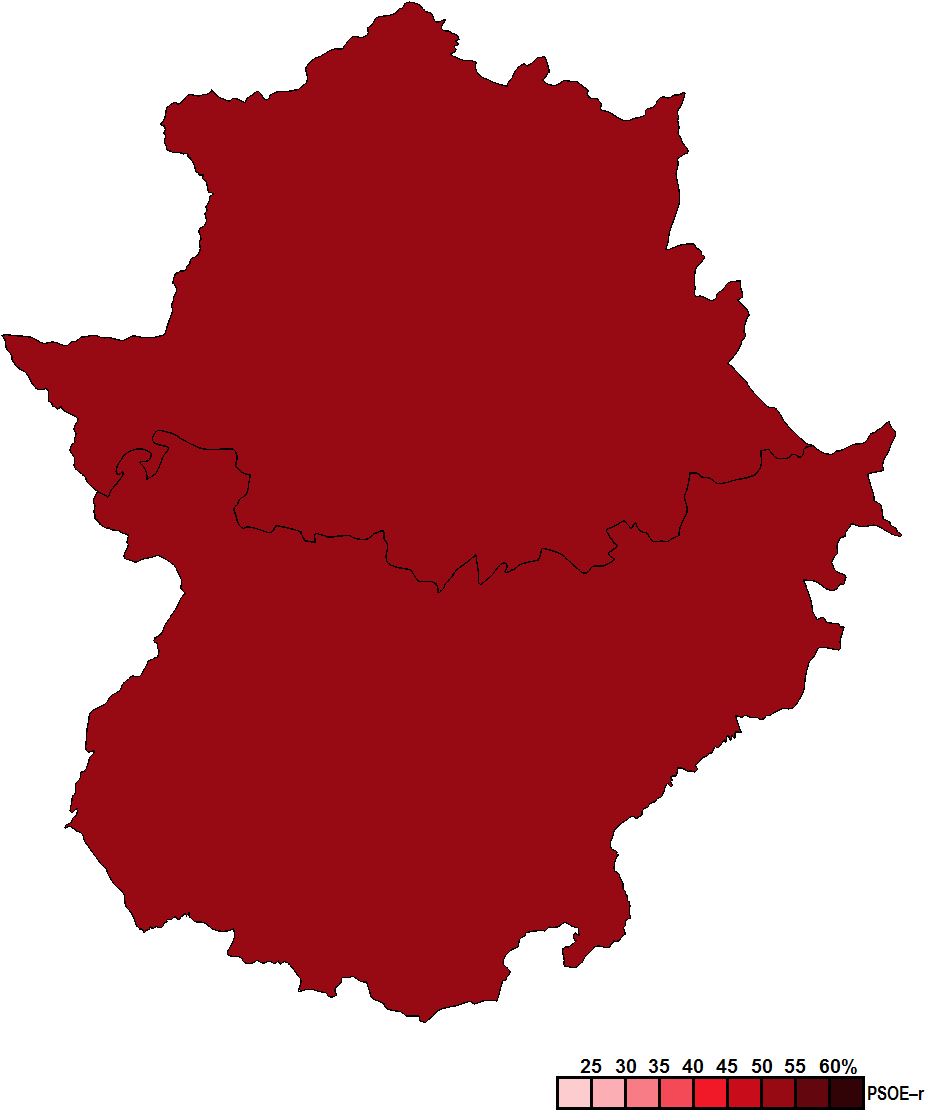
- Constituency results map for the Assembly of Extremadura
President before election
Juan Carlos Rodríguez Ibarra
PSOE
President after election
Guillermo Fernández Vara
PSOE

A regional election was held in Extremadura on 27 May 2007 to elect the 7th Assembly of the autonomous community. All 65 seats in the Assembly were up for election. It was held concurrently with regional elections in twelve other autonomous communities and local elections all across Spain.

Spanish Socialist Workers' Party (PSOE) leader Guillermo Fernández Vara, who replaced Juan Carlos Rodríguez Ibarra as his party's candidate after 25 years of rule in the region, went on to win a comfortable absolute majority with 38 out of 65 seats, almost equalling the party's best result in the region in 1991. The opposition People's Party (PP), which for this election ran in coalition with regionalist United Extremadura (EU) party, was unable to make any significant gains, winning 1 seat to 2003 but losing ground when compared with the combined PP-EU vote share of that year's election.

United Left (IU), for the first time in its history, was unable to meet the 5% party threshold either regionally or in any of the provinces and was left out of the Assembly, this being the only time that just two parties had parliamentary representation in the Extremaduran Assembly.

== Overview ==
Under the 1983 Statute of Autonomy, the Assembly of Extremadura was the unicameral legislature of the homonymous autonomous community, having legislative power in devolved matters, as well as the ability to grant or withdraw confidence from a regional president. The electoral and procedural rules were supplemented by national law provisions.

=== Date ===
The term of the Assembly of Extremadura expired four years after the date of its previous ordinary election, with election day being fixed for the fourth Sunday of May every four years. The election decree was required to be issued no later than 54 days before the scheduled election date and published on the following day in the Official Journal of Extremadura (DOE). The previous election was held on 25 May 2003, setting the date for election day on the fourth Sunday of May four years later, which was 27 May 2007.

The regional president had the prerogative to dissolve the Assembly of Extremadura at any given time and call a snap election, provided that no motion of no confidence was in process, no nationwide election had been called and that dissolution did not occur either during the first legislative session or during the last year of parliament before its planned expiration, nor before one year after a previous one. In the event of an investiture process failing to elect a regional president within a two-month period from the first ballot, the Assembly was to be automatically dissolved and a fresh election called. Any snap election held as a result of these circumstances did not alter the date of the chamber's next ordinary election, with elected lawmakers serving the remainder of its original four-year term.

The election to the Assembly of Extremadura was officially called on 3 April 2007 with the publication of the corresponding decree in the DOE, setting election day for 27 May.

=== Electoral system ===
Voting for the Assembly was based on universal suffrage, comprising all Spanish nationals over 18 years of age, registered in Extremadura and with full political rights, provided that they had not been deprived of the right to vote by a final sentence, nor were legally incapacitated.

The Assembly of Extremadura had a maximum of 65 seats, with electoral provisions fixing its size at that number. All were elected in two multi-member constituencies—corresponding to the provinces of Badajoz and Cáceres, each of which was assigned an initial minimum of 20 seats and the remaining 25 distributed in proportion to population—using the D'Hondt method and closed-list proportional voting, with a five percent-threshold of valid votes (including blank ballots) in each constituency. Alternatively, parties could also enter the seat distribution as long as they ran candidates in both constituencies and reached five percent regionally.

As a result of the aforementioned allocation, each Assembly constituency was entitled the following seats:

Seats	Constituencies
35	Badajoz
30	Cáceres

The law did not provide for by-elections to fill vacant seats; instead, any vacancies arising after the proclamation of candidates and during the legislative term were filled by the next candidates on the party lists or, when required, by designated substitutes.

=== Outgoing parliament ===
The table below shows the composition of the parliamentary groups in the chamber at the time of the election call.

Parliamentary composition in April 2007
Groups	Parties	Legislators	
Groups	Parties	Seats	Total
Socialist Parliamentary Group	PSOE	34	36
Socialist Parliamentary Group	PREx–CREx	2	36
People's Parliamentary Group	PP	26	26
Mixed Parliamentary Group	IU	2	3
Mixed Parliamentary Group	SIEx	1	3

== Parties and candidates ==
The electoral law allowed for parties and federations registered in the interior ministry, alliances and groupings of electors to present lists of candidates. Parties and federations intending to form an alliance were required to inform the relevant electoral commission within 10 days of the election call, whereas groupings of electors needed to secure the signature of at least two percent of the electorate in the constituencies for which they sought election, disallowing electors from signing for more than one list. Amendments earlier in 2007 required a balanced composition of men and women in the electoral lists, so that candidates of either sex made up at least 40 percent of the total composition.

Below is a list of the main parties and alliances which contested the election:

Candidacy	Parties and alliances	Candidate	Ideology	Previous result		Gov.	Ref.
Candidacy	Parties and alliances	Candidate	Ideology	Vote %	Seats	Gov.	Ref.
PSOE–r	List: Spanish Socialist Workers' Party (PSOE); Extremaduran Coalition (PREx–CREx) – Extremaduran Regionalist Party (PREx) – Regionalist Convergence of Extremadura (CREx)	Guillermo Fernández Vara	Social democracy	51.7%	36	Yes	
PP–EU	List: People's Party (PP); United Extremadura (EU)	Carlos Floriano	Conservatism; Christian democracy	40.5%	26	No	
IU–SIEx	List: United Left (IU) – Communist Party of Extremadura (PCEx) – Revolutionary Workers' Party (POR); Independent Socialists of Extremadura (SIEx)	Víctor Casco	Socialism; Communism	6.3%	3	No	

== Opinion polls ==
The tables below list opinion polling results in reverse chronological order, showing the most recent first and using the dates when the survey fieldwork was done, as opposed to the date of publication. Where the fieldwork dates are unknown, the date of publication is given instead. The highest percentage figure in each polling survey is displayed with its background shaded in the leading party's colour. If a tie ensues, this is applied to the figures with the highest percentages. The "Lead" column on the right shows the percentage-point difference between the parties with the highest percentages in a poll.

=== Voting intention estimates ===
The table below lists weighted voting intention estimates. Refusals are generally excluded from the party vote percentages, while question wording and the treatment of "don't know" responses and those not intending to vote may vary between polling organisations. When available, seat projections determined by the polling organisations are displayed below (or in place of) the percentages in a smaller font; 33 seats were required for an absolute majority in the Assembly of Extremadura.

Color key:

Exit poll

Polling firm/Commissioner	Fieldwork date	Sample size	Turnout	PSOE	PP	IU	Lead
2007 regional election	27 May 2007	—N/a	75.0	53.0; 38	38.7; 27	4.5; 0	14.3
Ipsos/RTVE–FORTA	27 May 2007	?	?	? 35/38	? 24/27	? 2/3	?
Celeste-Tel/Terra	9–15 May 2007	?	?	50.9; 34/35	39.8; 27/28	6.2; 3	11.1
TNS Demoscopia/Antena 3	14 May 2007	?	?	? 35/37	? 27/29	? 0/2	?
Opinòmetre/El Periódico	10–14 May 2007	?	?	? 33/34	? 27/28	? 4/5	?
CEPS/PP (Note: Undecided and/or abstentionists excluded.)	8 May 2007	2,761	71.9	46.6; 30/31	48.5; 32/33	4.9; 2/3	1.9
Sigma Dos/El Mundo	27 Apr–8 May 2007	700	?	50.1; 34/36	42.3; 29/31	3.4; 0	7.8
CIS	9 Apr–6 May 2007	1,199	?	52.1; 35	39.0; 27	6.0; 3	13.1
Synovate/PSOE	27 Apr 2007	1,000	?	50.3– 52.0; 34/35	41.0– 41.6; 27/28	5.5; 2/3	9.3– 10.4
Investiga/Canal Extremadura	10–23 Apr 2007	1,021	?	? 38/39	? 23/24	? 3/4	?
CEPS/PP	17 Apr 2007	1,100	69.8	48.3; 31	46.7; 31	5.0; 3	1.6
Opina/PSOE	25–29 Nov 2006	1,200	?	50.1; 35	40.8; 29	5.0; 1	9.3
Sigma Dos/El Mundo	16–24 Nov 2006	?	?	49.3; 33/35	41.4; 27/29	5.5; 3	7.9
Opinòmetre/El Periódico	2–10 Nov 2006	?	?	? 32/33	? 29/30	? 3	?
Synovate/PSOE	8–10 Mar 2006	813	?	51.1; 36	40.5; 27	5.2; 2	10.6
2004 EP election	13 Jun 2004	—N/a	49.5	52.2 (35)	43.2 (30)	2.6 (0)	9.0
2004 general election	14 Mar 2004	—N/a	79.3	51.2 (35)	42.4 (30)	3.5 (0)	8.8
2003 regional election	25 May 2003	—N/a	75.6	51.7; 36	38.7; 26	6.3; 3	13.0

=== Voting preferences ===
The table below lists raw, unweighted voting preferences.

Polling firm/Commissioner	Fieldwork date	Sample size	PSOE	PP	IU	Question	X mark	Lead
2007 regional election (Note: Does not include non-resident citizens.)	27 May 2007	—N/a	39.9	29.3	3.4	—N/a	23.9	10.6
Opinòmetre/El Periódico	10–14 May 2007	?	36.0	27.2	3.5	25.0	5.5	8.8
CEPS/PP	8 May 2007	2,761	28.2	32.3	2.4	5.7	22.4	4.1
CIS	9 Apr–6 May 2007	1,199	42.6	18.4	2.9	30.1	4.3	24.2
CEPS/PP	17 Apr 2007	1,100	33.7	32.6	3.5	30.2		1.1
Opinòmetre/El Periódico	2–10 Nov 2006	?	27.0	20.8	1.8	30.8	14.9	6.2
2004 EP election	13 Jun 2004	—N/a	25.9	21.5	1.3	—N/a	50.2	4.4
2004 general election	14 Mar 2004	—N/a	41.1	34.1	2.8	—N/a	19.1	7.0
2003 regional election	25 May 2003	—N/a	39.4	29.6	4.8	—N/a	23.0	9.8

=== Victory preferences ===
The table below lists opinion polling on the victory preferences for each party in the event of a regional election taking place.

Polling firm/Commissioner	Fieldwork date	Sample size	PSOE	PP	IU	Other/ None	Question	Lead
CIS	9 Apr–6 May 2007	1,199	50.9	23.2	2.7	4.2	19.0	27.7
Opina/PSOE	25–29 Nov 2006	1,200	43.7	28.7	2.4	4.4	20.8	15.0

=== Victory likelihood ===
The table below lists opinion polling on the perceived likelihood of victory for each party in the event of a regional election taking place.

Polling firm/Commissioner	Fieldwork date	Sample size	PSOE	PP	IU	Other/ None	Question	Lead
CIS	9 Apr–6 May 2007	1,199	70.0	7.5	0.2	0.2	22.2	62.5

=== Preferred President ===
The table below lists opinion polling on leader preferences to become president of the Regional Government of Extremadura.

Polling firm/Commissioner	Fieldwork date	Sample size				Other/ None/ Not care	Question	Lead
Polling firm/Commissioner	Fieldwork date	Sample size	Vara PSOE	Floriano PP	Casco IU	Other/ None/ Not care	Question	Lead
Opinòmetre/El Periódico	10–14 May 2007	?	22.6	13.6	0.7	20.1	43.0	9.0
CIS	9 Apr–6 May 2007	1,199	42.9	20.5	2.8	0.8	33.1	22.4
Investiga/Canal Extremadura	10–23 Apr 2007	1,021	35.0	22.3	2.9	–	36.0	12.7
Opina/PSOE	25–29 Nov 2006	1,200	41.3	24.5	–	–	–	16.8

== Results ==
=== Overall ===
← Summary of the 27 May 2007 Assembly of Extremadura election results →
Parties and alliances	Popular vote			Seats	
Parties and alliances	Votes	%	±pp	Total	+/−
Spanish Socialist Workers' Party–Regionalists (PSOE–regionalistas)	352,342	53.00	+1.34	38	+2
People's Party–United Extremadura (PP–EU)^{1}	257,392	38.71	−1.83	27	+1
United Left–Independent Socialists of Extremadura (IU–SIEx)	30,028	4.52	−1.75	0	−3
Independents for Extremadura (IPEx)	8,389	1.26	New	0	±0
The Greens of Extremadura (LV)	4,082	0.61	New	0	±0
Extremaduran People's Union (UPEx)	1,520	0.23	New	0	±0
Living Initiative (IH)	958	0.14	New	0	±0
Communist Party of the Peoples of Spain (PCPE)	903	0.14	New	0	±0
Citizens for Blank Votes (CenB)	499	0.08	New	0	±0
Democratic and Social Centre (CDS)	445	0.07	New	0	±0
Humanist Party (PH)	370	0.06	−0.10	0	±0
Blank ballots	7,926	1.19	−0.18		
Total	664,854			65	±0
Valid votes	664,854	99.27	+0.08		
Invalid votes	4,898	0.73	−0.08		
Votes cast / turnout	669,752	74.95	−0.68		
Abstentions	223,795	25.05	+0.68		
Registered voters	893,547				
Sources
Footnotes: ^{1} People's Party–United Extremadura results are compared to the combined totals of the People's Party and United Extremadura in the 2003 election.

Popular vote
PSOE–r	53.00%
PP–EU	38.71%
IU–SIEx	4.52%
IPEx	1.26%
Others	1.32%
Blank ballots	1.19%

Seats
PSOE–r	58.46%
PP–EU	41.54%

=== Distribution by constituency ===
Constituency	PSOE–r		PP–EU	
Constituency	%	S	%	S
Badajoz	53.8	21	37.7	14
Cáceres	51.8	17	40.2	13
Total	53.0	38	38.7	27

== Aftermath ==
=== Government formation ===
Investiture; Nomination of Guillermo Fernández Vara (PSOE)
Ballot →	27 June 2007
Required majority →	33 out of 65
Yes: • PSOE–r (37)	37 / 65
No: • PP–EU (27)	27 / 65
Abstentions	0 / 65
Absentees: • PSOE–r (1)	1 / 65

== Bibliography ==
- Ley Orgánica 1/1983, de 25 de febrero, de Estatuto de Autonomía de Extremadura (Organic Law 1/1983). Official State Gazette (in Spanish). 25 February 1983 [version as of 2 July 2002]. BOE-A-1983-6190.
- Ley Orgánica 5/1985, de 19 de junio, del Régimen Electoral General (Organic Law 5/1985). Official State Gazette (in Spanish). 19 June 1985 [version as of 20 April 2007]. BOE-A-1985-11672.
- Ley 2/1987, de 16 de marzo, de Elecciones a la Asamblea de Extremadura (Law 2/1987). Official State Gazette (in Spanish). 16 March 1987 [version as of 26 March 1991]. BOE-A-1987-8817.
- Ley 1/2002, de 28 de febrero, del Gobierno y de la Administración de la Comunidad Autónoma de Extremadura (Law 1/2002). Official State Gazette (in Spanish). 28 February 2002 [version as of 29 December 2003]. BOE-A-2002-7297.
- Decreto del Presidente 3/2007, de 2 de abril, por el que se convocan elecciones a la Asamblea de Extremadura (PDF) (Decree 3/2007). Official Journal of Extremadura (in Spanish). 2 April 2007.
