= 2003 Extremaduran regional election =

Election in the Spanish region of Extremadura

- 25 May 2003

All 65 seats in the Assembly of Extremadura 33 seats needed for a majority
- Opinion polls
- Registered: 881,228 ▼0.5%
- Turnout: 666,468 (75.6%) ▲2.2 pp
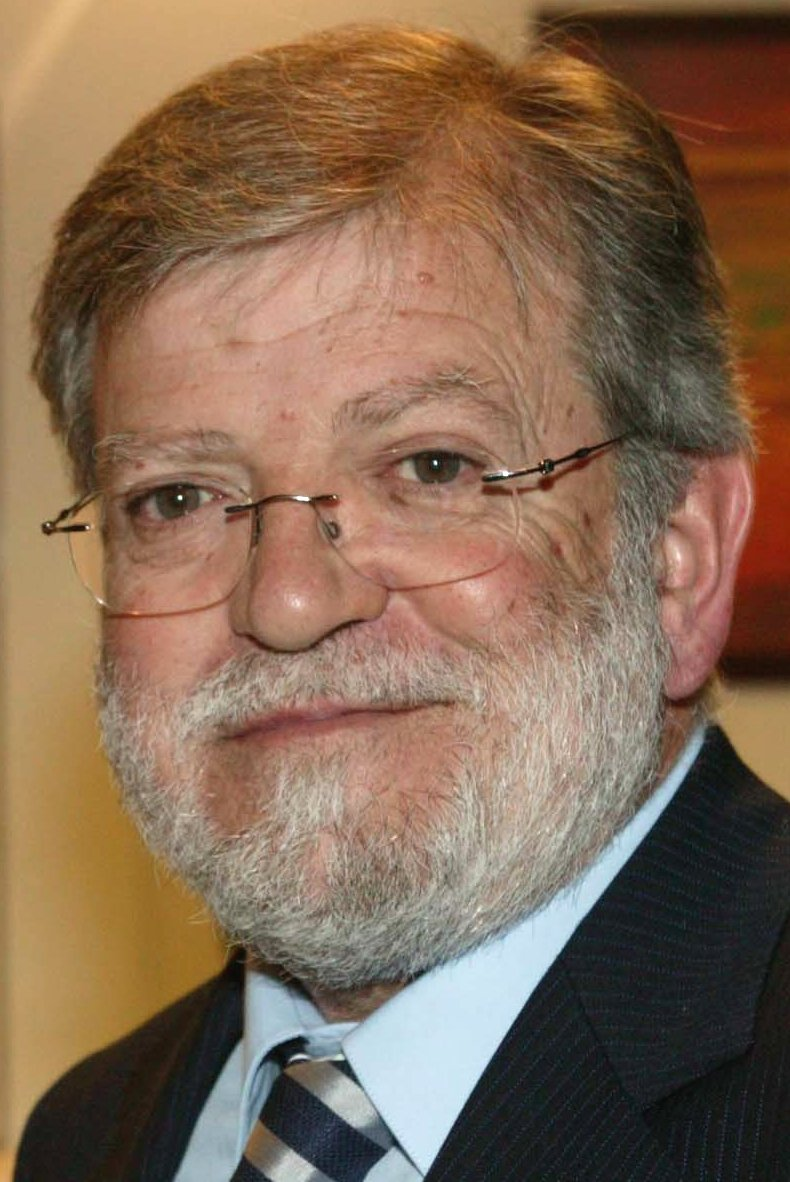

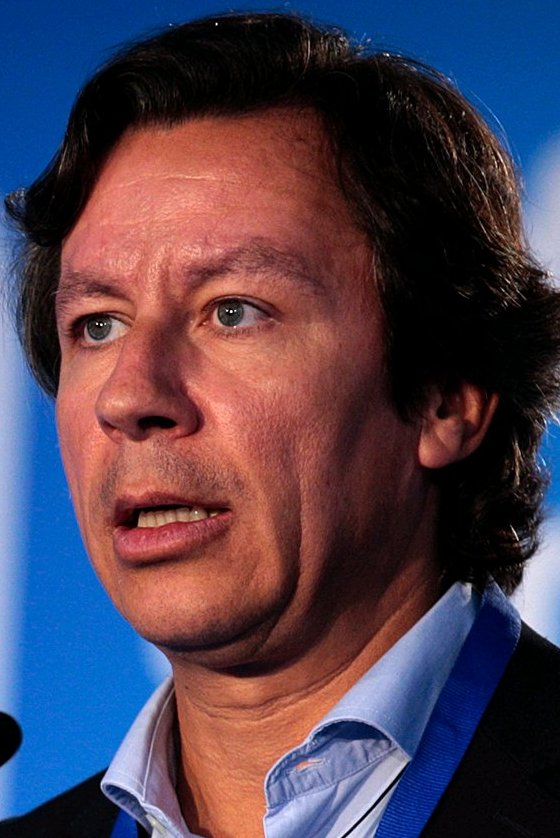

	First party	Second party	Third party
Leader	Juan Carlos Rodríguez Ibarra	Carlos Floriano	Manuel Cañada
Party	PSOE–p	PP	IU–SIEx
Leader since	20 December 1982	13 October 2000	1 October 1995
Leader's seat	Badajoz	Cáceres	Badajoz
Last election	34 seats, 49.6% (Note: Results for PSOE–p (48.5%, 34 seats) and CREx–PREx (1.2%, 0 seats) in the 1999 election.)	28 seats, 40.0%	3 seats, 7.0% (Note: Results for IU–CE (6.1%, 3 seats) and SIEx (1.0%, 0 seats) in the 1999 election.)
Seats won	36	26	3
Seat change	▲2	▼2	0
Popular vote	341,522	255,808	41,448
Percentage	51.7%	38.7%	6.3%
Swing	▲2.1 pp	▼1.3 pp	▼0.7 pp
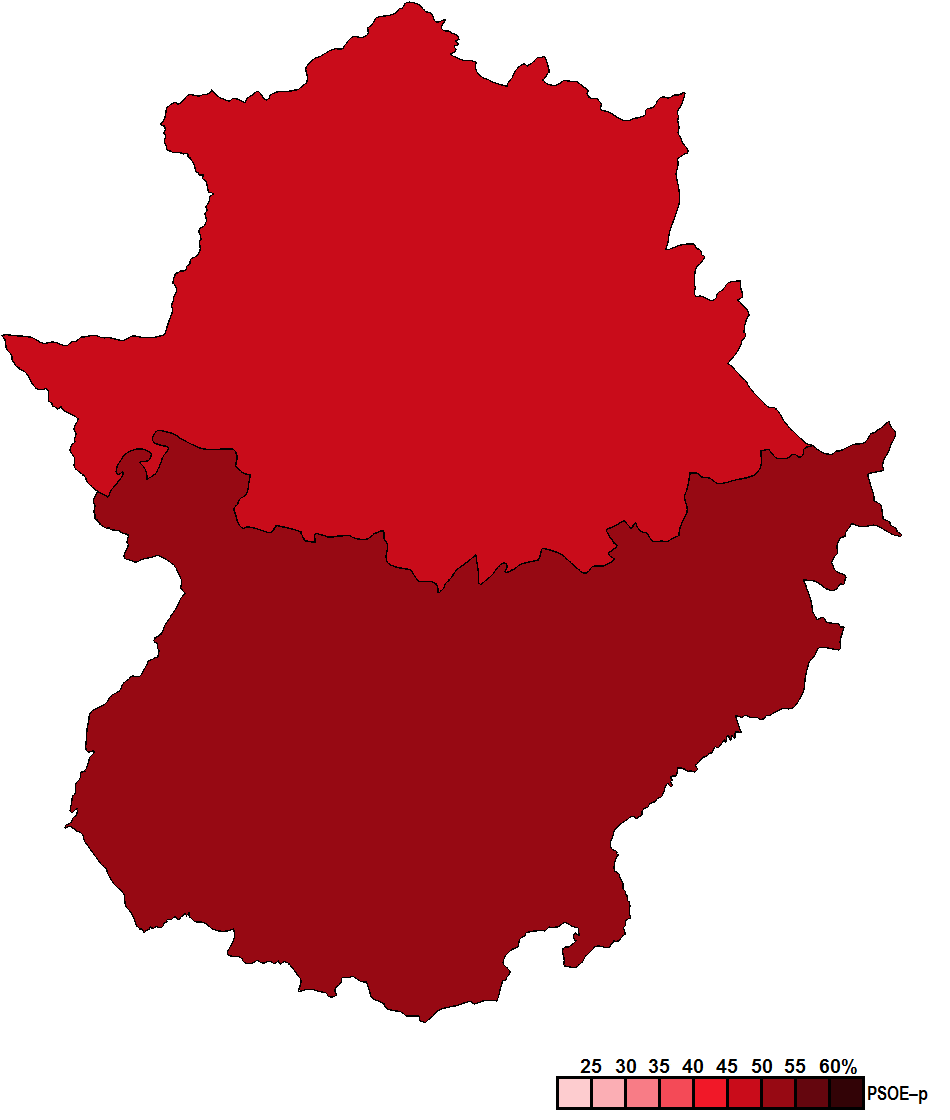
- Constituency results map for the Assembly of Extremadura
President before election
Juan Carlos Rodríguez Ibarra
PSOE
President after election
Juan Carlos Rodríguez Ibarra
PSOE

A regional election was held in Extremadura on 25 May 2003 to elect the 6th Assembly of the autonomous community. All 65 seats in the Assembly were up for election. It was held concurrently with regional elections in twelve other autonomous communities and local elections all across Spain.

The Spanish Socialist Workers' Party (PSOE), which in this election ran in coalition with the Extremaduran Coalition, enlarged its absolute majority from 34 to 36 seats, at the cost of the opposition People's Party (PP), which fell to 26 and lost ground for the first time since the 1987 election. United Left (IU), which formed a coalition with the Independent Socialists of Extremadura (SIEx), maintained its three seats but was unable to make gains.

Juan Carlos Rodríguez Ibarra was elected for his sixth and last term in office as President of the Regional Government of Extremadura, as he would announce in September 2006 he would not run for re-election in 2007.

== Overview ==
Under the 1983 Statute of Autonomy, the Assembly of Extremadura was the unicameral legislature of the homonymous autonomous community, having legislative power in devolved matters, as well as the ability to grant or withdraw confidence from a regional president. The electoral and procedural rules were supplemented by national law provisions.

=== Date ===
The term of the Assembly of Extremadura expired four years after the date of its previous ordinary election, with election day being fixed for the fourth Sunday of May every four years. The election decree was required to be issued no later than 54 days before the scheduled election date and published on the following day in the Official Journal of Extremadura (DOE). The previous election was held on 13 June 1999, setting the date for election day on the fourth Sunday of May four years later, which was 25 May 2003.

The regional president had the prerogative to dissolve the Assembly of Extremadura at any given time and call a snap election, provided that no motion of no confidence was in process, no nationwide election had been called and that dissolution did not occur either during the first legislative session or during the last year of parliament before its planned expiration, nor before one year after a previous one. In the event of an investiture process failing to elect a regional president within a two-month period from the first ballot, the Assembly was to be automatically dissolved and a fresh election called. Any snap election held as a result of these circumstances did not alter the date of the chamber's next ordinary election, with elected lawmakers serving the remainder of its original four-year term.

The election to the Assembly of Extremadura was officially called on 1 April 2003 with the publication of the corresponding decree in the DOE, setting election day for 25 May.

=== Electoral system ===
Voting for the Assembly was based on universal suffrage, comprising all Spanish nationals over 18 years of age, registered in Extremadura and with full political rights, provided that they had not been deprived of the right to vote by a final sentence, nor were legally incapacitated.

The Assembly of Extremadura had a maximum of 65 seats, with electoral provisions fixing its size at that number. All were elected in two multi-member constituencies—corresponding to the provinces of Badajoz and Cáceres, each of which was assigned an initial minimum of 20 seats and the remaining 25 distributed in proportion to population—using the D'Hondt method and closed-list proportional voting, with a five percent-threshold of valid votes (including blank ballots) in each constituency. Alternatively, parties could also enter the seat distribution as long as they ran candidates in both constituencies and reached five percent regionally.

As a result of the aforementioned allocation, each Assembly constituency was entitled the following seats:

Seats	Constituencies
35	Badajoz^{(−1)}
30	Cáceres^{(+1)}

The law did not provide for by-elections to fill vacant seats; instead, any vacancies arising after the proclamation of candidates and during the legislative term were filled by the next candidates on the party lists or, when required, by designated substitutes.

=== Outgoing parliament ===
The table below shows the composition of the parliamentary groups in the chamber at the time of the election call.

Parliamentary composition in April 2003
Groups	Parties	Legislators	
Groups	Parties	Seats	Total
Socialist Parliamentary Group	PSOE	34	34
People's Parliamentary Group	PP	28	28
Mixed Parliamentary Group	IU	3	3

== Parties and candidates ==
The electoral law allowed for parties and federations registered in the interior ministry, alliances and groupings of electors to present lists of candidates. Parties and federations intending to form an alliance were required to inform the relevant electoral commission within 10 days of the election call, whereas groupings of electors needed to secure the signature of at least two percent of the electorate in the constituencies for which they sought election, disallowing electors from signing for more than one list.

Below is a list of the main parties and alliances which contested the election:

Candidacy	Parties and alliances	Candidate	Ideology	Previous result		Gov.	Ref.
Candidacy	Parties and alliances	Candidate	Ideology	Vote %	Seats	Gov.	Ref.
PSOE–p	List: Spanish Socialist Workers' Party (PSOE); Extremaduran Coalition (PREx–CREx) – Extremaduran Regionalist Party (PREx) – Regionalist Convergence of Extremadura (CREx)	Juan Carlos Rodríguez Ibarra	Social democracy	49.6%	34	Yes	
PP	List: People's Party (PP)	Carlos Floriano	Conservatism; Christian democracy	40.0%	28	No	
IU–SIEx	List: United Left (IU) – Communist Party of Extremadura (PCEx) – Revolutionary Workers' Party (POR) – Workers' Revolutionary Party–Revolutionary Left (PRT–IR); Independent Socialists of Extremadura (SIEx)	Manuel Cañada	Socialism; Communism	7.0%	3	No	

== Opinion polls ==
The tables below list opinion polling results in reverse chronological order, showing the most recent first and using the dates when the survey fieldwork was done, as opposed to the date of publication. Where the fieldwork dates are unknown, the date of publication is given instead. The highest percentage figure in each polling survey is displayed with its background shaded in the leading party's colour. If a tie ensues, this is applied to the figures with the highest percentages. The "Lead" column on the right shows the percentage-point difference between the parties with the highest percentages in a poll.

=== Voting intention estimates ===
The table below lists weighted voting intention estimates. Refusals are generally excluded from the party vote percentages, while question wording and the treatment of "don't know" responses and those not intending to vote may vary between polling organisations. When available, seat projections determined by the polling organisations are displayed below (or in place of) the percentages in a smaller font; 33 seats were required for an absolute majority in the Assembly of Extremadura.

Color key:

Exit poll

Polling firm/Commissioner	Fieldwork date	Sample size	Turnout	PSOE	PP	IU	EU	PREx–CREx	Lead
2003 regional election	25 May 2003	—N/a	75.6	51.7; 36	38.7; 26	6.3; 3	1.8; 0	(Note: Within PSOE.)	13.0
Sigma Dos/Antena 3	25 May 2003	?	?	? 34/35	? 27	? 3/4	–		?
Ipsos–Eco/RTVE	25 May 2003	?	?	? 34/36	? 25/27	? 3/5	–		?
CIS	22 Mar–28 Apr 2003	1,238	74.9	51.5; 35	39.2; 26	7.3; 4	–	0.1; 0	12.3
Vox Pública/El Periódico (Note: "Comunidad Autónoma de Extremadura". El Periódico de Catalunya (in Spanish). 4 May 2003. Archived from the original on 21 June 2003.)	23 Apr 2003	805	?	50.0– 51.0; 36/37	37.5– 38.5; 26/27	5.0– 6.0; 2/3	1.0– 2.0; 0	–	12.5
CIS	9 Sep–9 Oct 2002	486	79.3	50.3	39.6	6.7	–	–	10.7
2000 general election	12 Mar 2000	—N/a	75.4	44.7 (31)	47.3 (32)	4.7 (2)	0.7 (0)	0.4 (0)	2.6
1999 regional election	13 Jun 1999	—N/a	73.4	48.5; 34	40.0; 28	6.1; 5	1.7; 0	1.2; 0	8.5

=== Voting preferences ===
The table below lists raw, unweighted voting preferences.

Polling firm/Commissioner	Fieldwork date	Sample size	PSOE	PP	IU	Question	X mark	Lead
2003 regional election (Note: Does not include non-resident citizens.)	25 May 2003	—N/a	39.4	29.6	4.8	—N/a	23.0	9.8
CIS	22 Mar–28 Apr 2003	1,238	40.8	18.9	4.4	30.6	3.8	21.9
CIS	9 Sep–9 Oct 2002	486	43.2	20.2	3.7	23.8	7.2	23.0
2000 general election	12 Mar 2000	—N/a	34.0	36.1	3.6	—N/a	23.3	2.6
1999 regional election	13 Jun 1999	—N/a	36.4	30.2	4.6	—N/a	24.4	6.2

=== Victory preferences ===
The table below lists opinion polling on the victory preferences for each party in the event of a regional election taking place.

Polling firm/Commissioner	Fieldwork date	Sample size	PSOE	PP	IU	Other/ None	Question	Lead
CIS	22 Mar–28 Apr 2003	1,238	48.5	22.2	5.6	1.2	22.5	26.3

=== Victory likelihood ===
The table below lists opinion polling on the perceived likelihood of victory for each party in the event of a regional election taking place.

Polling firm/Commissioner	Fieldwork date	Sample size	PSOE	PP	IU	Other/ None	Question	Lead
CIS	22 Mar–28 Apr 2003	1,238	69.6	6.9	0.3	0.0	23.2	62.7

=== Preferred President ===
The table below lists opinion polling on leader preferences to become president of the Regional Government of Extremadura.

Polling firm/Commissioner	Fieldwork date	Sample size				Other/ None/ Not care	Question	Lead
Polling firm/Commissioner	Fieldwork date	Sample size	Ibarra PSOE	Floriano PP	Cañada IU	Other/ None/ Not care	Question	Lead
CIS	22 Mar–28 Apr 2003	1,238	51.7	19.1	5.3	1.2	22.8	32.6

== Results ==
=== Overall ===
← Summary of the 25 May 2003 Assembly of Extremadura election results →
Parties and alliances	Popular vote			Seats	
Parties and alliances	Votes	%	±pp	Total	+/−
Spanish Socialist Workers' Party–Progressives (PSOE–p)^{1}	341,522	51.66	+2.03	36	+2
People's Party (PP)	255,808	38.70	−1.31	26	−2
United Left–Independent Socialists of Extremadura (IU–SIEx)^{2}	41,448	6.27	−0.74	3	±0
United Extremadura (EU)	12,171	1.84	+0.17	0	±0
Humanist Party (PH)	1,082	0.16	New	0	±0
Blank ballots	9,033	1.37	+0.22		
Total	661,064			65	±0
Valid votes	661,064	99.19	−0.19		
Invalid votes	5,404	0.81	+0.19		
Votes cast / turnout	666,468	75.63	+2.19		
Abstentions	214,760	24.37	−2.19		
Registered voters	881,228				
Sources
Footnotes: ^{1} Spanish Socialist Workers' Party–Progressives results are compared to the combined totals of Spanish Socialist Workers' Party–Progressives and Extremaduran Coalition in the 1999 election.; ^{2} United Left–Independent Socialists of Extremadura results are compared to the combined totals of United Left–Commitment to Extremadura and Independent Socialists of Extremadura in the 1999 election.

Popular vote
PSOE–p	51.66%
PP	38.70%
IU–SIEx	6.27%
EU	1.84%
PH	0.16%
Blank ballots	1.37%

Seats
PSOE–p	55.38%
PP	40.00%
IU–SIEx	4.62%

=== Distribution by constituency ===
Constituency	PSOE–p		PP		IU–SIEx	
Constituency	%	S	%	S	%	S
Badajoz	53.5	20	37.2	13	6.9	2
Cáceres	48.8	16	41.0	13	5.3	1
Total	51.7	36	38.7	26	6.3	3

== Aftermath ==
=== Government formation ===
Investiture; Nomination of Juan Carlos Rodríguez Ibarra (PSOE)
Ballot →	23 June 2003
Required majority →	33 out of 65
Yes: • PSOE–p (36)	36 / 65
No: • PP (26); • IU–SIEx (3)	29 / 65
Abstentions	0 / 65
Absentees	0 / 65

== Bibliography ==
- Ley Orgánica 1/1983, de 25 de febrero, de Estatuto de Autonomía de Extremadura (Organic Law 1/1983). Official State Gazette (in Spanish). 25 February 1983 [version as of 2 July 2002]. BOE-A-1983-6190.
- Ley Orgánica 5/1985, de 19 de junio, del Régimen Electoral General (Organic Law 5/1985). Official State Gazette (in Spanish). 19 June 1985 [version as of 11 March 2003]. BOE-A-1985-11672.
- Ley 2/1987, de 16 de marzo, de Elecciones a la Asamblea de Extremadura (Law 2/1987). Official State Gazette (in Spanish). 16 March 1987 [version as of 26 March 1991]. BOE-A-1987-8817.
- Ley 1/2002, de 28 de febrero, del Gobierno y de la Administración de la Comunidad Autónoma de Extremadura (Law 1/2002). Official State Gazette (in Spanish). 28 February 2002 [version as of 26 March 2002]. BOE-A-2002-7297.
- Decreto del Presidente 6/2003, de 31 de marzo, por el que se convocan elecciones a la Asamblea de Extremadura (PDF) (Decree 6/2003). Official Journal of Extremadura (in Spanish). 31 March 2003.
