= 1987 Spanish local elections in Catalonia =

This article presents the results breakdown of the local elections held in Catalonia on 10 June 1987. The following tables show detailed results in the autonomous community's most populous municipalities, sorted alphabetically.

== City control ==
The following table lists party control in the most populous municipalities, including provincial capitals (highlighted in bold). Gains for a party are highlighted in that party's colour.

Municipality	Population	Previous control	New control
Badalona	225,016	Socialists' Party of Catalonia (PSC–PSOE)	Socialists' Party of Catalonia (PSC–PSOE)
**Barcelona**	1,701,812	Socialists' Party of Catalonia (PSC–PSOE)	Socialists' Party of Catalonia (PSC–PSOE)
Cornellà de Llobregat	86,928	Socialists' Party of Catalonia (PSC–PSOE)	Socialists' Party of Catalonia (PSC–PSOE)
**Girona**	67,009	Socialists' Party of Catalonia (PSC–PSOE)	Socialists' Party of Catalonia (PSC–PSOE)
L'Hospitalet de Llobregat	279,779	Socialists' Party of Catalonia (PSC–PSOE)	Socialists' Party of Catalonia (PSC–PSOE)
**Lleida**	107,749	Socialists' Party of Catalonia (PSC–PSOE)	Convergence and Union (CiU) (PSC–PSOE in 1989)
Mataró	100,021	Socialists' Party of Catalonia (PSC–PSOE)	Socialists' Party of Catalonia (PSC–PSOE)
Reus	81,145	Socialists' Party of Catalonia (PSC–PSOE)	Socialists' Party of Catalonia (PSC–PSOE)
Sabadell	186,115	Initiative for Catalonia (IC)	Initiative for Catalonia (IC)
Sant Boi de Llobregat	75,789	Socialists' Party of Catalonia (PSC–PSOE)	Socialists' Party of Catalonia (PSC–PSOE)
Sant Cugat del Vallès	30,633	Socialists' Party of Catalonia (PSC–PSOE)	Convergence and Union (CiU)
Santa Coloma de Gramenet	135,258	Initiative for Catalonia (IC)	Initiative for Catalonia (IC)
**Tarragona**	106,495	Socialists' Party of Catalonia (PSC–PSOE)	Socialists' Party of Catalonia (PSC–PSOE) (CiU in 1989)
Terrassa	160,105	Socialists' Party of Catalonia (PSC–PSOE)	Socialists' Party of Catalonia (PSC–PSOE)

== Municipalities ==
=== Badalona ===
Population: 225,016

← Summary of the 10 June 1987 City Council of Badalona election results →
Parties and alliances	Popular vote			Seats	
Parties and alliances	Votes	%	±pp	Total	+/−
Socialists' Party of Catalonia (PSC–PSOE)	42,227	42.94	+3.55	13	+1
Initiative for Catalonia (IC)^{1}	30,626	31.14	−9.04	10	−1
Convergence and Union (CiU)	14,297	14.54	+4.35	4	+1
People's Alliance (AP)^{2}	3,563	3.62	−2.64	0	−1
Democratic and Social Centre (CDS)	3,430	3.49	New	0	±0
Republican Left of Catalonia (ERC)	1,141	1.16	−0.83	0	±0
Workers' Party of Catalonia–Communist Unity (PTC–UC)	1,050	1.07	New	0	±0
Humanist Platform (PH)	581	0.59	New	0	±0
Internationalist Socialist Workers' Party (POSI)	320	0.33	New	0	±0
Spanish Phalanx of the CNSO (FE–JONS)	183	0.19	New	0	±0
People's Democratic Party (PDP)	0	0.00	New	0	±0
Blank ballots	930	0.95	+0.68		
Total	98,348			27	±0
Valid votes	98,348	99.20	±0.00		
Invalid votes	795	0.80	±0.00		
Votes cast / turnout	99,143	62.63	+0.08		
Abstentions	59,162	37.37	−0.08		
Registered voters	158,305				
Sources
Footnotes: ^{1} Initiative for Catalonia results are compared to the combined totals of Unified Socialist Party of Catalonia and Party of the Communists of Catalonia in the 1983 election.; ^{2} People's Alliance results are compared to People's Coalition totals in the 1983 election.

=== Barcelona ===
Population: 1,701,812

=== Cornellà de Llobregat ===
Population: 86,928

← Summary of the 10 June 1987 City Council of Cornellà de Llobregat election results →
Parties and alliances	Popular vote			Seats	
Parties and alliances	Votes	%	±pp	Total	+/−
Socialists' Party of Catalonia (PSC–PSOE)	21,916	51.56	+9.12	15	+4
Initiative for Catalonia (IC)^{1}	10,361	24.38	−20.10	7	−5
Convergence and Union (CiU)	4,272	10.05	+3.05	2	+1
Democratic and Social Centre (CDS)	2,580	6.07	New	1	+1
People's Alliance (AP)^{2}	2,051	4.83	−0.99	0	−1
Workers' Party of Catalonia–Communist Unity (PTC–UC)	659	1.55	New	0	±0
Humanist Platform (PH)	229	0.54	New	0	±0
Blank ballots	436	1.03	+0.77		
Total	42,504			25	±0
Valid votes	42,504	99.02	+0.33		
Invalid votes	422	0.98	−0.33		
Votes cast / turnout	42,926	66.00	+1.44		
Abstentions	22,109	34.00	−1.44		
Registered voters	65,035				
Sources
Footnotes: ^{1} Initiative for Catalonia results are compared to the combined totals of Unified Socialist Party of Catalonia and Party of the Communists of Catalonia in the 1983 election.; ^{2} People's Alliance results are compared to People's Coalition totals in the 1983 election.

=== Girona ===
Population: 67,009

← Summary of the 10 June 1987 City Council of Girona election results →
Parties and alliances	Popular vote			Seats	
Parties and alliances	Votes	%	±pp	Total	+/−
Socialists' Party of Catalonia (PSC–PSOE)	15,257	48.44	−3.29	14	−1
Convergence and Union (CiU)	9,251	29.37	+6.86	9	+3
People's Alliance (AP)^{1}	2,106	6.69	−5.10	2	−1
Initiative for Catalonia (IC)^{2}	1,540	4.89	−1.95	0	−1
Republican Left of Catalonia (ERC)	1,487	4.72	−0.19	0	±0
Democratic and Social Centre (CDS)	1,306	4.15	+2.32	0	±0
Humanist Platform (PH)	174	0.55	New	0	±0
Republican Popular Unity (UPR)	83	0.26	New	0	±0
Blank ballots	291	0.92	+0.52		
Total	31,495			25	±0
Valid votes	31,495	99.17	+0.19		
Invalid votes	265	0.83	−0.19		
Votes cast / turnout	31,760	67.07	−2.62		
Abstentions	15,591	32.93	+2.62		
Registered voters	47,351				
Sources
Footnotes: ^{1} People's Alliance results are compared to People's Coalition totals in the 1983 election.; ^{2} Initiative for Catalonia results are compared to the combined totals of Unified Socialist Party of Catalonia and Party of the Communists of Catalonia in the 1983 election.; ^{3} Republican Popular Unity results are compared to Popular Struggle Coalition totals in the 1983 election.

=== L'Hospitalet de Llobregat ===
Population: 279,779

← Summary of the 10 June 1987 City Council of L'Hospitalet de Llobregat election results →
Parties and alliances	Popular vote			Seats	
Parties and alliances	Votes	%	±pp	Total	+/−
Socialists' Party of Catalonia (PSC–PSOE)	75,633	57.77	−6.92	17	−3
Convergence and Union (CiU)	18,570	14.18	+5.59	4	+2
Initiative for Catalonia (IC)^{1}	13,792	10.53	−4.63	3	±0
Democratic and Social Centre (CDS)	9,646	7.37	+6.38	2	+2
People's Alliance (AP)^{2}	8,850	6.76	−1.30	1	−1
Workers' Party of Catalonia–Communist Unity (PTC–UC)	1,885	1.44	New	0	±0
Humanist Platform (PH)	858	0.66	New	0	±0
Communist Workers' League (LOC)	380	0.29	New	0	±0
People's Democratic Party (PDP)	40	0.03	New	0	±0
Blank ballots	1,268	0.97	+0.64		
Total	130,922			27	±0
Valid votes	130,922	98.88	+0.70		
Invalid votes	1,489	1.12	−0.70		
Votes cast / turnout	132,411	64.15	+0.20		
Abstentions	73,993	35.85	−0.20		
Registered voters	206,404				
Sources
Footnotes: ^{1} Initiative for Catalonia results are compared to the combined totals of Unified Socialist Party of Catalonia and Party of the Communists of Catalonia in the 1983 election.; ^{2} People's Alliance results are compared to People's Coalition totals in the 1983 election.

=== Lleida ===
Population: 107,749

← Summary of the 10 June 1987 City Council of Lleida election results →
Parties and alliances	Popular vote			Seats	
Parties and alliances	Votes	%	±pp	Total	+/−
Socialists' Party of Catalonia (PSC–PSOE)	19,804	37.31	−16.87	12	−5
Convergence and Union (CiU)	17,393	32.77	+16.11	11	+6
Freixes Independent Group (Freixes)	4,083	7.69	New	2	+2
People's Alliance (AP)^{1}	3,913	7.37	−8.71	2	−3
Democratic and Social Centre (CDS)	2,240	4.22	+1.30	0	±0
Initiative for Catalonia (IC)^{2}	1,982	3.73	−2.52	0	±0
Republican Left of Catalonia (ERC)	1,487	2.80	−0.70	0	±0
Green Alternative–Ecologist Movement of Catalonia (AV–MEC)	1,415	2.67	New	0	±0
Humanist Platform (PH)	237	0.45	New	0	±0
People's Democratic Party (PDP)	0	0.00	New	0	±0
Blank ballots	523	0.99	+0.57		
Total	53,077			27	±0
Valid votes	53,077	99.41	+0.83		
Invalid votes	313	0.59	−0.83		
Votes cast / turnout	53,390	64.62	+3.52		
Abstentions	29,230	35.38	−3.52		
Registered voters	82,620				
Sources
Footnotes: ^{1} People's Alliance results are compared to People's Coalition totals in the 1983 election.; ^{2} Initiative for Catalonia results are compared to the combined totals of Unified Socialist Party of Catalonia and Party of the Communists of Catalonia in the 1983 election.

=== Mataró ===
Population: 100,021

← Summary of the 10 June 1987 City Council of Mataró election results →
Parties and alliances	Popular vote			Seats	
Parties and alliances	Votes	%	±pp	Total	+/−
Socialists' Party of Catalonia (PSC–PSOE)	22,311	45.36	−6.28	14	−1
Convergence and Union (CiU)	16,500	33.55	+10.10	11	+5
Initiative for Catalonia (IC)^{1}	3,403	6.92	−3.59	2	±0
People's Alliance (AP)^{2}	2,174	4.42	−3.95	0	−2
Democratic and Social Centre (CDS)	1,861	3.78	+2.38	0	±0
Republican Left of Catalonia (ERC)	1,557	3.17	−1.12	0	±0
Independents of Mataró (IM)	804	1.63	New	0	±0
Humanist Platform (PH)	202	0.41	New	0	±0
Blank ballots	374	0.76	+0.42		
Total	49,186			27	+2
Valid votes	49,186	99.08	+0.21		
Invalid votes	459	0.92	−0.21		
Votes cast / turnout	49,645	68.37	−1.57		
Abstentions	22,964	31.63	+1.57		
Registered voters	72,609				
Sources
Footnotes: ^{1} Initiative for Catalonia results are compared to the combined totals of Unified Socialist Party of Catalonia and Party of the Communists of Catalonia in the 1983 election.; ^{2} People's Alliance results are compared to People's Coalition totals in the 1983 election.

=== Reus ===
Population: 81,145

← Summary of the 10 June 1987 City Council of Reus election results →
Parties and alliances	Popular vote			Seats	
Parties and alliances	Votes	%	±pp	Total	+/−
Socialists' Party of Catalonia (PSC–PSOE)	14,286	40.38	−3.09	11	−1
Convergence and Union (CiU)	10,957	30.97	+7.11	8	+2
People's Alliance (AP)^{1}	2,877	8.13	−5.48	2	−1
Republican Left of Catalonia (ERC)	2,804	7.92	−0.13	2	±0
Democratic and Social Centre (CDS)	2,146	6.07	+5.67	1	+1
Union of Municipal Progress (UdPM)^{2}	1,984	5.61	−1.53	1	−1
Humanist Platform (PH)	0	0.00	New	0	±0
Blank ballots	328	0.93	+0.62		
Total	35,382			25	±0
Valid votes	35,382	99.02	+0.04		
Invalid votes	350	0.98	−0.04		
Votes cast / turnout	35,732	59.68	+3.89		
Abstentions	24,140	40.32	−3.89		
Registered voters	59,872				
Sources
Footnotes: ^{1} People's Alliance results are compared to People's Coalition totals in the 1983 election.; ^{2} Union of Municipal Progress results are compared to Unified Socialist Party of Catalonia totals in the 1983 election.

=== Sabadell ===
Population: 186,115

← Summary of the 10 June 1987 City Council of Sabadell election results →
Parties and alliances	Popular vote			Seats	
Parties and alliances	Votes	%	±pp	Total	+/−
Initiative for Catalonia (IC)^{1}	43,138	47.00	−7.39	14	−1
Convergence and Union (CiU)	20,536	22.37	+3.29	7	+2
Socialists' Party of Catalonia (PSC–PSOE)	18,349	19.99	+2.60	6	+1
People's Alliance (AP)^{2}	3,154	3.44	−3.23	0	−2
Democratic and Social Centre (CDS)	2,566	2.80	New	0	±0
Republican Left of Catalonia (ERC)	1,563	1.70	−0.03	0	±0
Workers' Party of Catalonia–Communist Unity (PTC–UC)	899	0.98	New	0	±0
Revolutionary Workers' Party of Spain (PORE)	388	0.42	New	0	±0
Humanist Platform (PH)	387	0.42	New	0	±0
Blank ballots	802	0.87	+0.60		
Total	91,782			27	±0
Valid votes	91,782	99.39	−0.17		
Invalid votes	560	0.61	+0.17		
Votes cast / turnout	92,342	72.58	+2.50		
Abstentions	34,880	27.42	−2.50		
Registered voters	127,222				
Sources
Footnotes: ^{1} Initiative for Catalonia results are compared to the combined totals of Unified Socialist Party of Catalonia and Party of the Communists of Catalonia in the 1983 election.; ^{2} People's Alliance results are compared to People's Coalition totals in the 1983 election.

=== Sant Boi de Llobregat ===
Population: 75,789

← Summary of the 10 June 1987 City Council of Sant Boi de Llobregat election results →
Parties and alliances	Popular vote			Seats	
Parties and alliances	Votes	%	±pp	Total	+/−
Socialists' Party of Catalonia (PSC–PSOE)	19,636	56.38	−7.68	17	−1
Convergence and Union (CiU)	6,664	19.14	+7.24	5	+2
Initiative for Catalonia (IC)^{1}	4,241	12.18	−2.29	3	±0
Democratic and Social Centre (CDS)	1,485	4.26	New	0	±0
People's Alliance (AP)^{2}	1,393	4.00	−1.22	0	−1
Workers' Party of Catalonia–Communist Unity (PTC–UC)	689	1.98	New	0	±0
Internationalist Socialist Workers' Party (POSI)	203	0.58	New	0	±0
Humanist Platform (PH)	170	0.49	New	0	±0
Blank ballots	344	0.98	+0.74		
Total	34,825			25	±0
Valid votes	34,825	98.75	+0.76		
Invalid votes	441	1.25	−0.76		
Votes cast / turnout	35,266	64.44	−2.64		
Abstentions	19,464	35.56	+2.64		
Registered voters	54,730				
Sources
Footnotes: ^{1} Initiative for Catalonia results are compared to the combined totals of Unified Socialist Party of Catalonia and Party of the Communists of Catalonia in the 1983 election.; ^{2} People's Alliance results are compared to People's Coalition totals in the 1983 election.

=== Sant Cugat del Vallès ===
Population: 30,633

← Summary of the 10 June 1987 City Council of Sant Cugat del Vallès election results →
Parties and alliances	Popular vote			Seats	
Parties and alliances	Votes	%	±pp	Total	+/−
Convergence and Union (CiU)	7,183	41.27	+17.39	9	+3
Socialists' Party of Catalonia (PSC–PSOE)	6,165	35.42	−5.96	8	−2
Initiative for Catalonia (IC)^{1}	1,510	8.68	+0.42	2	+1
People's Alliance (AP)^{2}	1,467	8.43	−4.20	2	−1
Republican Left of Catalonia (ERC)	742	4.26	−0.84	0	−1
Workers' Party of Catalonia–Communist Unity (PTC–UC)	143	0.82	New	0	±0
Blank ballots	196	1.13	+0.66		
Total	17,406			21	±0
Valid votes	17,406	98.93	−0.26		
Invalid votes	188	1.07	+0.26		
Votes cast / turnout	17,594	67.99	+1.58		
Abstentions	8,285	32.01	−1.58		
Registered voters	25,879				
Sources
Footnotes: ^{1} Initiative for Catalonia results are compared to the combined totals of Unified Socialist Party of Catalonia and Party of the Communists of Catalonia in the 1983 election.; ^{2} People's Alliance results are compared to People's Coalition totals in the 1983 election.

=== Santa Coloma de Gramenet ===
Population: 135,258

← Summary of the 10 June 1987 City Council of Santa Coloma de Gramenet election results →
Parties and alliances	Popular vote			Seats	
Parties and alliances	Votes	%	±pp	Total	+/−
Initiative for Catalonia (IC)^{1}	27,610	44.50	−5.06	13	−2
Socialists' Party of Catalonia (PSC–PSOE)	24,965	40.24	+1.65	12	±0
Convergence and Union (CiU)	4,524	7.29	+2.61	2	+2
People's Alliance (AP)^{2}	1,537	2.48	−2.20	0	±0
Democratic and Social Centre (CDS)	1,526	2.46	+1.93	0	±0
Workers' Party of Catalonia–Communist Unity (PTC–UC)	1,103	1.78	New	0	±0
Humanist Platform (PH)	375	0.60	New	0	±0
Blank ballots	406	0.65	+0.47		
Total	62,046			27	±0
Valid votes	62,046	99.30	+1.34		
Invalid votes	438	0.70	−1.34		
Votes cast / turnout	62,484	65.75	+2.04		
Abstentions	32,542	34.25	−2.04		
Registered voters	95,026				
Sources
Footnotes: ^{1} Initiative for Catalonia results are compared to the combined totals of Unified Socialist Party of Catalonia and Party of the Communists of Catalonia in the 1983 election.; ^{2} People's Alliance results are compared to People's Coalition totals in the 1983 election.

=== Tarragona ===
Population: 106,495

← Summary of the 10 June 1987 City Council of Tarragona election results →
Parties and alliances	Popular vote			Seats	
Parties and alliances	Votes	%	±pp	Total	+/−
Socialists' Party of Catalonia (PSC–PSOE)	18,840	37.33	−6.19	12	−2
Convergence and Union (CiU)	16,322	32.34	+13.74	10	+4
People's Alliance (AP)^{1}	4,950	9.81	−7.50	3	−2
Democratic and Social Centre (CDS)	3,686	7.30	+5.67	2	+2
Union of Municipal Progress (UdPM)^{2}	2,025	4.01	−3.08	0	−2
Left Proposal for Catalonia (PEC)	1,735	3.44	+0.04	0	±0
Republican Left of Catalonia (ERC)	1,313	2.60	−2.04	0	±0
Workers' Party of Catalonia–Communist Unity (PTC–UC)	742	1.47	New	0	±0
Humanist Platform (PH)	288	0.57	New	0	±0
Blank ballots	567	1.12	+0.69		
Total	50,468			27	±0
Valid votes	50,468	99.03	−0.06		
Invalid votes	495	0.97	+0.06		
Votes cast / turnout	50,963	64.16	+0.43		
Abstentions	28,464	35.84	−0.43		
Registered voters	79,427				
Sources
Footnotes: ^{1} People's Alliance results are compared to People's Coalition totals in the 1983 election.; ^{2} Union of Municipal Progress results are compared to Unified Socialist Party of Catalonia totals in the 1983 election.

=== Terrassa ===
Population: 160,105

← Summary of the 10 June 1987 City Council of Terrassa election results →
Parties and alliances	Popular vote			Seats	
Parties and alliances	Votes	%	±pp	Total	+/−
Socialists' Party of Catalonia (PSC–PSOE)	36,030	48.19	−12.78	15	−3
Convergence and Union (CiU)	18,449	24.67	+6.77	8	+3
Initiative for Catalonia (IC)^{1}	8,057	10.78	+2.76	3	+1
People's Alliance (AP)^{2}	3,945	5.28	−2.94	1	−1
Democratic and Social Centre (CDS)	3,352	4.48	New	0	±0
Republican Left of Catalonia (ERC)	2,277	3.05	+1.35	0	±0
Workers' Party of Catalonia–Communist Unity (PTC–UC)	801	1.07	New	0	±0
Workers' Socialist Party (PST)	584	0.78	New	0	±0
Humanist Platform (PH)	399	0.53	New	0	±0
Blank ballots	875	1.17	+0.85		
Total	74,769			27	±0
Valid votes	74,769	99.19	+0.06		
Invalid votes	610	0.81	−0.06		
Votes cast / turnout	75,379	64.65	−4.04		
Abstentions	41,225	35.35	+4.04		
Registered voters	116,604				
Sources
Footnotes: ^{1} Initiative for Catalonia results are compared to Unified Socialist Party of Catalonia totals in the 1983 election.; ^{2} People's Alliance results are compared to People's Coalition totals in the 1983 election.
