= 1995 Spanish local elections in Catalonia =

This article presents the results breakdown of the local elections held in Catalonia on 28 May 1995. The following tables show detailed results in the autonomous community's most populous municipalities, sorted alphabetically.

== City control ==
The following table lists party control in the most populous municipalities, including provincial capitals (highlighted in bold). Gains for a party are highlighted in that party's colour.

Municipality	Population	Previous control	New control
Badalona	219,340	Socialists' Party of Catalonia (PSC–PSOE)	Socialists' Party of Catalonia (PSC–PSOE)
**Barcelona**	1,630,867	Socialists' Party of Catalonia (PSC–PSOE)	Socialists' Party of Catalonia (PSC–PSOE)
Cornellà de Llobregat	84,142	Socialists' Party of Catalonia (PSC–PSOE)	Socialists' Party of Catalonia (PSC–PSOE)
**Girona**	72,333	Socialists' Party of Catalonia (PSC–PSOE)	Socialists' Party of Catalonia (PSC–PSOE)
L'Hospitalet de Llobregat	266,242	Socialists' Party of Catalonia (PSC–PSOE)	Socialists' Party of Catalonia (PSC–PSOE)
**Lleida**	114,234	Socialists' Party of Catalonia (PSC–PSOE)	Socialists' Party of Catalonia (PSC–PSOE)
Mataró	102,117	Socialists' Party of Catalonia (PSC–PSOE)	Socialists' Party of Catalonia (PSC–PSOE)
Reus	90,059	Socialists' Party of Catalonia (PSC–PSOE)	Socialists' Party of Catalonia (PSC–PSOE)
Sabadell	189,006	Initiative for Catalonia–The Greens (IC–EV)	Initiative for Catalonia–The Greens (IC–EV)
Sant Boi de Llobregat	79,594	Socialists' Party of Catalonia (PSC–PSOE)	Socialists' Party of Catalonia (PSC–PSOE)
Sant Cugat del Vallès	43,373	Convergence and Union (CiU)	Convergence and Union (CiU)
Santa Coloma de Gramenet	131,764	Socialists' Party of Catalonia (PSC–PSOE)	Socialists' Party of Catalonia (PSC–PSOE)
**Tarragona**	114,630	Convergence and Union (CiU)	Convergence and Union (CiU)
Terrassa	161,428	Socialists' Party of Catalonia (PSC–PSOE)	Socialists' Party of Catalonia (PSC–PSOE)

== Municipalities ==
=== Badalona ===
Population: 219,340

← Summary of the 28 May 1995 City Council of Badalona election results →
Parties and alliances	Popular vote			Seats	
Parties and alliances	Votes	%	±pp	Total	+/−
Socialists' Party of Catalonia (PSC–PSOE)	31,363	32.47	−14.40	10	−4
Initiative for Catalonia–The Greens (IC–EV)^{1}	24,881	25.76	−0.28	7	±0
Convergence and Union (CiU)	19,192	19.87	+3.62	6	+1
People's Party (PP)	15,268	15.81	+9.68	4	+3
Republican Left of Catalonia (ERC)	4,463	4.62	+2.97	0	±0
Civic Platform–New Socialist Party (PC–NPS)	205	0.21	New	0	±0
Blank ballots	1,206	1.25	+0.34		
Total	96,578			27	±0
Valid votes	96,578	99.74	+0.06		
Invalid votes	248	0.26	−0.06		
Votes cast / turnout	96,826	56.15	+9.72		
Abstentions	75,620	43.85	−9.72		
Registered voters	172,446				
Sources
Footnotes: ^{1} Initiative for Catalonia–The Greens results are compared to the combined totals of Initiative for Catalonia and Left Proposal for Catalonia–Party of the Communists of Catalonia in the 1991 election.

=== Barcelona ===
Population: 1,630,867

=== Cornellà de Llobregat ===
Population: 84,142

← Summary of the 28 May 1995 City Council of Cornellà de Llobregat election results →
Parties and alliances	Popular vote			Seats	
Parties and alliances	Votes	%	±pp	Total	+/−
Socialists' Party of Catalonia (PSC–PSOE)	20,996	51.07	−4.10	14	−2
Initiative for Catalonia–The Greens (IC–EV)^{1}	9,363	22.77	−0.61	6	+1
People's Party (PP)	5,345	13.00	+7.70	3	+2
Convergence and Union (CiU)	3,560	8.66	−3.40	2	−1
Republican Left of Catalonia (ERC)	1,100	2.68	New	0	±0
Democratic and Social Centre (CDS)	321	0.78	−1.23	0	±0
Blank ballots	429	1.04	+0.24		
Total	41,114			25	±0
Valid votes	41,114	99.63	−0.01		
Invalid votes	151	0.37	+0.01		
Votes cast / turnout	41,265	60.77	+11.05		
Abstentions	26,643	39.23	−11.05		
Registered voters	67,908				
Sources
Footnotes: ^{1} Initiative for Catalonia–The Greens results are compared to the combined totals of Initiative for Catalonia and Party of the Communists of Catalonia in the 1991 election.

=== Girona ===
Population: 72,333

← Summary of the 28 May 1995 City Council of Girona election results →
Parties and alliances	Popular vote			Seats	
Parties and alliances	Votes	%	±pp	Total	+/−
Socialists' Party of Catalonia (PSC–PSOE)	17,628	49.71	+2.17	14	+1
Convergence and Union (CiU)	7,238	20.41	−10.38	5	−4
People's Party (PP)	4,255	12.00	+5.08	3	+1
Republican Left of Catalonia (ERC)	3,697	10.42	+4.73	2	+1
Initiative for Catalonia–The Greens (IC–EV)^{1}	2,231	6.29	+0.87	1	+1
Blank ballots	415	1.17	+0.07		
Total	35,464			25	±0
Valid votes	35,464	99.48	−0.01		
Invalid votes	186	0.52	+0.01		
Votes cast / turnout	35,650	63.88	+5.85		
Abstentions	20,156	36.12	−5.85		
Registered voters	55,806				
Sources
Footnotes: ^{1} Initiative for Catalonia–The Greens results are compared to the combined totals of Initiative for Catalonia and Party of the Communists of Catalonia in the 1991 election.

=== L'Hospitalet de Llobregat ===
Population: 266,242

← Summary of the 28 May 1995 City Council of L'Hospitalet de Llobregat election results →
Parties and alliances	Popular vote			Seats	
Parties and alliances	Votes	%	±pp	Total	+/−
Socialists' Party of Catalonia (PSC–PSOE)	60,839	47.77	−7.50	14	−3
People's Party (PP)	21,822	17.14	+8.64	5	+3
Initiative for Catalonia–The Greens (IC–EV)^{1}	21,224	16.67	+3.46	4	+1
Convergence and Union (CiU)	17,199	13.51	−2.04	4	−1
Republican Left of Catalonia (ERC)	3,308	2.60	+1.18	0	±0
L'Hospitalet Independents (Il'H)	1,117	0.88	New	0	±0
Revolutionary Workers' Party (POR)	334	0.26	New	0	±0
Blank ballots	1,508	1.18	+0.41		
Total	127,351			27	±0
Valid votes	127,351	99.71	+0.03		
Invalid votes	368	0.29	−0.03		
Votes cast / turnout	127,719	59.42	+11.37		
Abstentions	87,239	40.58	−11.37		
Registered voters	214,958				
Sources
Footnotes: ^{1} Initiative for Catalonia–The Greens results are compared to the combined totals of Initiative for Catalonia and Party of the Communists of Catalonia in the 1991 election.

=== Lleida ===
Population: 114,234

← Summary of the 28 May 1995 City Council of Lleida election results →
Parties and alliances	Popular vote			Seats	
Parties and alliances	Votes	%	±pp	Total	+/−
Socialists' Party of Catalonia (PSC–PSOE)	24,454	43.89	−5.49	13	−4
Convergence and Union (CiU)	13,182	23.66	−1.93	7	−1
People's Party (PP)	9,543	17.13	+9.09	5	+3
Initiative for Catalonia–The Greens (IC–EV)^{1}	3,722	6.68	+1.07	1	+1
Republican Left of Catalonia (ERC)	3,036	5.45	+2.00	1	+1
Freixes Independent Group (Freixes)	978	1.76	−3.07	0	±0
People's Unity Assembly (AUP)	139	0.25	New	0	±0
Free Catalonia (CLL)	104	0.19	New	0	±0
Group of Independents, Progressives and Nationalists (AIPN)	41	0.07	−0.09	0	±0
Blank ballots	515	0.92	−0.41		
Total	55,714			27	±0
Valid votes	55,714	99.68	+0.44		
Invalid votes	180	0.32	−0.44		
Votes cast / turnout	55,894	60.32	+4.10		
Abstentions	36,773	39.68	−4.10		
Registered voters	92,667				
Sources
Footnotes: ^{1} Initiative for Catalonia–The Greens results are compared to the combined totals of Initiative for Catalonia–Green Alternative and Party of the Communists of Catalonia in the 1991 election.

=== Mataró ===
Population: 102,117

← Summary of the 28 May 1995 City Council of Mataró election results →
Parties and alliances	Popular vote			Seats	
Parties and alliances	Votes	%	±pp	Total	+/−
Socialists' Party of Catalonia (PSC–PSOE)	19,136	36.93	−5.30	11	−2
Convergence and Union (CiU)	15,345	29.61	−6.14	9	−2
People's Party (PP)	7,618	14.70	+8.98	4	+3
Initiative for Catalonia–The Greens (IC–EV)^{1}	5,935	11.45	+1.33	3	+1
Republican Left of Catalonia (ERC)	2,520	4.86	+3.45	0	±0
Ecologist Alternative of Catalonia (AEC)^{2}	751	1.45	−0.93	0	±0
Blank ballots	514	0.99	+0.42		
Total	51,819			27	±0
Valid votes	51,819	99.75	+0.02		
Invalid votes	130	0.25	−0.02		
Votes cast / turnout	51,949	65.25	+5.92		
Abstentions	27,666	34.75	−5.92		
Registered voters	79,615				
Sources
Footnotes: ^{1} Initiative for Catalonia–The Greens results are compared to the combined totals of Initiative for Catalonia and Left Proposal for Catalonia in the 1991 election.; ^{2} Ecologist Alternative of Catalonia results are compared to The Greens–Green Union totals in the 1991 election.

=== Reus ===
Population: 90,059

← Summary of the 28 May 1995 City Council of Reus election results →
Parties and alliances	Popular vote			Seats	
Parties and alliances	Votes	%	±pp	Total	+/−
Socialists' Party of Catalonia (PSC–PSOE)	14,819	36.44	−7.84	10	−3
Convergence and Union (CiU)	11,580	28.48	−4.68	7	−3
People's Party (PP)	5,866	14.42	+8.48	4	+3
Initiative for Catalonia–The Greens (IC–EV)	3,772	9.28	+4.78	2	+2
Republican Left of Catalonia (ERC)	3,557	8.75	+2.76	2	+1
Left Proposal for Catalonia (PEC)	573	1.41	−1.36	0	±0
Blank ballots	499	1.23	+0.06		
Total	40,666			25	±0
Valid votes	40,666	99.67	+0.10		
Invalid votes	135	0.33	−0.10		
Votes cast / turnout	40,801	58.24	+2.90		
Abstentions	29,261	41.76	−2.90		
Registered voters	70,062				

=== Sabadell ===
Population: 189,006

← Summary of the 28 May 1995 City Council of Sabadell election results →
Parties and alliances	Popular vote			Seats	
Parties and alliances	Votes	%	±pp	Total	+/−
Initiative for Catalonia–The Greens (IC–EV)^{1}	45,227	51.08	−0.09	15	±0
Socialists' Party of Catalonia (PSC–PSOE)	15,831	17.88	−0.70	5	−1
Convergence and Union (CiU)	14,109	15.93	−3.82	4	−2
People's Party (PP)	8,565	9.67	+5.23	3	+3
Republican Left of Catalonia (ERC)	3,165	3.57	+1.39	0	±0
Independent and Citizen Alternative Candidacy of Sabadell (CAIC)	677	0.76	−0.47	0	±0
Workers' Revolutionary Party (PRT)	219	0.25	New	0	±0
Blank ballots	748	0.84	+0.05		
Total	88,541			27	±0
Valid votes	88,541	99.71	+0.02		
Invalid votes	261	0.29	−0.02		
Votes cast / turnout	88,802	58.95	+6.68		
Abstentions	61,832	41.05	−6.68		
Registered voters	150,634				
Sources
Footnotes: ^{1} Initiative for Catalonia–The Greens results are compared to the combined totals of Initiative for Catalonia and Left Proposal for Catalonia–Party of the Communists of Catalonia in the 1991 election.

=== Sant Boi de Llobregat ===
Population: 79,594

← Summary of the 28 May 1995 City Council of Sant Boi de Llobregat election results →
Parties and alliances	Popular vote			Seats	
Parties and alliances	Votes	%	±pp	Total	+/−
Socialists' Party of Catalonia (PSC–PSOE)	14,063	39.17	−13.12	10	−5
Initiative for Catalonia–The Greens (IC–EV)	9,146	25.47	+10.17	7	+3
Convergence and Union (CiU)	6,467	18.01	−3.78	5	−1
People's Party (PP)	4,575	12.74	+7.93	3	+3
Republican Left of Catalonia (ERC)	1,233	3.43	+2.04	0	±0
Blank ballots	420	1.17	+0.44		
Total	35,904			25	±0
Valid votes	35,904	99.74	+0.11		
Invalid votes	94	0.26	−0.11		
Votes cast / turnout	35,998	57.64	+9.18		
Abstentions	26,453	42.36	−9.18		
Registered voters	62,451				

=== Sant Cugat del Vallès ===
Population: 43,373

← Summary of the 28 May 1995 City Council of Sant Cugat del Vallès election results →
Parties and alliances	Popular vote			Seats	
Parties and alliances	Votes	%	±pp	Total	+/−
Convergence and Union (CiU)	8,591	39.36	−8.01	10	−2
Socialists' Party of Catalonia (PSC–PSOE)	4,851	22.23	−0.25	5	±0
People's Party (PP)	3,058	14.01	+6.03	3	+1
Initiative for Catalonia–The Greens (IC–EV)	2,373	10.87	+0.09	2	±0
Republican Left of Catalonia (ERC)	1,606	7.36	+3.44	1	+1
Union of Independents of Sant Cugat (UNIS)	951	4.36	+0.30	0	±0
Blank ballots	396	1.81	+0.18		
Total	21,826			21	±0
Valid votes	21,826	99.59	+0.15		
Invalid votes	89	0.41	−0.15		
Votes cast / turnout	21,915	63.21	+6.81		
Abstentions	12,756	36.79	−6.81		
Registered voters	34,671				

=== Santa Coloma de Gramenet ===
Population: 131,764

← Summary of the 28 May 1995 City Council of Santa Coloma de Gramenet election results →
Parties and alliances	Popular vote			Seats	
Parties and alliances	Votes	%	±pp	Total	+/−
Socialists' Party of Catalonia (PSC–PSOE)	27,782	42.89	−0.52	12	−1
Initiative for Catalonia–The Greens (IC–EV)^{1}	26,738	41.28	−1.13	12	±0
People's Party (PP)	4,608	7.11	+4.08	2	+2
Convergence and Union (CiU)	4,057	6.26	−1.39	1	−1
Republican Left of Catalonia (ERC)	561	0.87	+0.50	0	±0
Independent Association of Santa Coloma (AISC)	321	0.50	−0.22	0	±0
Revolutionary Workers' Party (POR)	171	0.26	New	0	±0
Blank ballots	540	0.83	+0.26		
Total	64,778			27	±0
Valid votes	64,778	99.78	+0.04		
Invalid votes	146	0.22	−0.04		
Votes cast / turnout	64,924	62.61	+13.10		
Abstentions	38,775	37.39	−13.10		
Registered voters	103,699				
Sources
Footnotes: ^{1} Initiative for Catalonia–The Greens results are compared to the combined totals of Initiative for Catalonia and Party of the Communists of Catalonia in the 1991 election.

=== Tarragona ===
Population: 114,630

← Summary of the 28 May 1995 City Council of Tarragona election results →
Parties and alliances	Popular vote			Seats	
Parties and alliances	Votes	%	±pp	Total	+/−
Convergence and Union (CiU)	25,365	44.39	+0.29	13	−1
Socialists' Party of Catalonia (PSC–PSOE)	14,385	25.18	−9.60	7	−4
People's Party (PP)	9,424	16.49	+7.86	5	+3
Initiative for Catalonia–The Greens (IC–EV)^{1}	4,922	8.61	+0.98	2	+2
Republican Left of Catalonia (ERC)	2,455	4.30	+1.16	0	±0
Canonginan Unity Group (AdUC)	0	0.00	±0.00	0	±0
Blank ballots	588	1.03	+0.40		
Total	57,139			27	±0
Valid votes	57,139	99.65	−0.05		
Invalid votes	203	0.35	+0.05		
Votes cast / turnout	57,342	63.29	+2.69		
Abstentions	33,260	36.71	−2.69		
Registered voters	90,602				
Sources
Footnotes: ^{1} Initiative for Catalonia–The Greens results are compared to the combined totals of Green Alternative–Ecologist Movement of Catalonia and Initiative for Catalonia in the 1991 election.

=== Terrassa ===
Population: 161,428

← Summary of the 28 May 1995 City Council of Terrassa election results →
Parties and alliances	Popular vote			Seats	
Parties and alliances	Votes	%	±pp	Total	+/−
Socialists' Party of Catalonia (PSC–PSOE)	33,583	43.53	−4.37	13	−2
Convergence and Union (CiU)	17,038	22.08	−4.37	6	−2
People's Party (PP)	10,431	13.52	+6.43	4	+2
Initiative for Catalonia–The Greens (IC–EV)^{1}	9,547	12.37	−1.16	3	+1
Republican Left of Catalonia (ERC)	4,674	6.06	+3.25	1	+1
Democratic and Social Centre (CDS)	410	0.53	−0.76	0	±0
Blank ballots	1,467	1.90	+1.08		
Total	77,150			27	±0
Valid votes	77,150	99.49	−0.14		
Invalid votes	396	0.51	+0.14		
Votes cast / turnout	77,546	59.57	+8.13		
Abstentions	52,636	40.43	−8.13		
Registered voters	130,182				
Sources
Footnotes: ^{1} Initiative for Catalonia–The Greens results are compared to the combined totals of Initiative for Catalonia, The Greens and Left Proposal for Catalonia–Party of the Communists of Catalonia in the 1991 election.

== See also ==
- 1995 Catalan regional election
