= 1991 Spanish local elections in Catalonia =

This article presents the results breakdown of the local elections held in Catalonia on 26 May 1991. The following tables show detailed results in the autonomous community's most populous municipalities, sorted alphabetically.

== City control ==
The following table lists party control in the most populous municipalities, including provincial capitals (highlighted in bold). Gains for a party are highlighted in that party's colour.

Municipality	Population	Previous control	New control
Badalona	225,207	Socialists' Party of Catalonia (PSC–PSOE)	Socialists' Party of Catalonia (PSC–PSOE)
**Barcelona**	1,707,286	Socialists' Party of Catalonia (PSC–PSOE)	Socialists' Party of Catalonia (PSC–PSOE)
Cornellà de Llobregat	86,287	Socialists' Party of Catalonia (PSC–PSOE)	Socialists' Party of Catalonia (PSC–PSOE)
**Girona**	70,876	Socialists' Party of Catalonia (PSC–PSOE)	Socialists' Party of Catalonia (PSC–PSOE)
L'Hospitalet de Llobregat	276,198	Socialists' Party of Catalonia (PSC–PSOE)	Socialists' Party of Catalonia (PSC–PSOE)
**Lleida**	111,825	Socialists' Party of Catalonia (PSC–PSOE)	Socialists' Party of Catalonia (PSC–PSOE)
Mataró	101,882	Socialists' Party of Catalonia (PSC–PSOE)	Socialists' Party of Catalonia (PSC–PSOE)
Reus	86,407	Socialists' Party of Catalonia (PSC–PSOE)	Socialists' Party of Catalonia (PSC–PSOE)
Sabadell	192,142	Initiative for Catalonia (IC)	Initiative for Catalonia (IC)
Sant Boi de Llobregat	78,882	Socialists' Party of Catalonia (PSC–PSOE)	Socialists' Party of Catalonia (PSC–PSOE)
Sant Cugat del Vallès	39,316	Convergence and Union (CiU)	Convergence and Union (CiU)
Santa Coloma de Gramenet	135,486	Initiative for Catalonia (IC)	Socialists' Party of Catalonia (PSC–PSOE)
**Tarragona**	112,360	Convergence and Union (CiU)	Convergence and Union (CiU)
Terrassa	161,682	Socialists' Party of Catalonia (PSC–PSOE)	Socialists' Party of Catalonia (PSC–PSOE)

== Municipalities ==
=== Badalona ===
Population: 225,207

← Summary of the 26 May 1991 City Council of Badalona election results →
Parties and alliances	Popular vote			Seats	
Parties and alliances	Votes	%	±pp	Total	+/−
Socialists' Party of Catalonia (PSC–PSOE)	36,228	46.87	+3.93	14	+1
Initiative for Catalonia (IC)	17,730	22.94	−8.20	7	−3
Convergence and Union (CiU)	12,560	16.25	+1.71	5	+1
People's Party (PP)^{1}	4,741	6.13	+2.51	1	+1
Left Proposal for Catalonia–Party of the Communists of Catalonia (PEC–PCC)	2,393	3.10	New	0	±0
Republican Left of Catalonia (ERC)	1,278	1.65	+0.49	0	±0
Democratic and Social Centre (CDS)	966	1.25	−2.24	0	±0
Workers' Socialist Party (PST)	383	0.50	New	0	±0
Centrist Unity (PED)	186	0.24	New	0	±0
Alliance for the Republic (AxR)^{2}	125	0.16	−0.17	0	±0
Blank ballots	705	0.91	−0.04		
Total	77,295			27	±0
Valid votes	77,295	99.68	+0.48		
Invalid votes	250	0.32	−0.48		
Votes cast / turnout	77,545	46.43	−16.20		
Abstentions	89,456	53.57	+16.20		
Registered voters	167,001				
Sources
Footnotes: ^{1} People's Party results are compared to the combined totals of People's Alliance and People's Democratic Party in the 1987 election.; ^{2} Alliance for the Republic results are compared to Internationalist Socialist Workers' Party totals in the 1987 election.

=== Barcelona ===
Population: 1,707,286

=== Cornellà de Llobregat ===
Population: 86,287

← Summary of the 26 May 1991 City Council of Cornellà de Llobregat election results →
Parties and alliances	Popular vote			Seats	
Parties and alliances	Votes	%	±pp	Total	+/−
Socialists' Party of Catalonia (PSC–PSOE)	18,720	55.17	+3.61	16	+1
Initiative for Catalonia (IC)	6,482	19.10	−5.28	5	−2
Convergence and Union (CiU)	4,091	12.06	+2.01	3	+1
People's Party (PP)^{1}	1,798	5.30	+0.47	1	+1
Party of the Communists of Catalonia (PCC)	1,453	4.28	New	0	±0
Democratic and Social Centre (CDS)	683	2.01	−4.06	0	−1
Free Catalonia (CLL)	430	1.27	New	0	±0
Blank ballots	273	0.80	−0.23		
Total	33,930			25	±0
Valid votes	33,930	99.64	+0.62		
Invalid votes	123	0.36	−0.62		
Votes cast / turnout	34,053	49.72	−16.28		
Abstentions	34,436	50.28	+16.28		
Registered voters	68,489				
Sources
Footnotes: ^{1} People's Party results are compared to People's Alliance totals in the 1987 election.

=== Girona ===
Population: 70,876

← Summary of the 26 May 1991 City Council of Girona election results →
Parties and alliances	Popular vote			Seats	
Parties and alliances	Votes	%	±pp	Total	+/−
Socialists' Party of Catalonia (PSC–PSOE)	14,451	47.54	−0.90	13	−1
Convergence and Union (CiU)	9,361	30.79	+1.42	9	±0
People's Party (PP)^{1}	2,103	6.92	+0.23	2	±0
Republican Left of Catalonia (ERC)	1,729	5.69	+0.97	1	+1
Initiative for Catalonia (IC)	1,250	4.11	−0.78	0	±0
Democratic and Social Centre (CDS)	416	1.37	−2.78	0	±0
Party of the Communists of Catalonia (PCC)	397	1.31	New	0	±0
Independentist and Unitary Ecologist Alternative (AEIU)	358	1.18	New	0	±0
Blank ballots	333	1.10	+0.18		
Total	30,398			25	±0
Valid votes	30,398	99.49	+0.32		
Invalid votes	155	0.51	−0.32		
Votes cast / turnout	30,553	58.03	−9.04		
Abstentions	22,100	41.97	+9.04		
Registered voters	52,653				
Sources
Footnotes: ^{1} People's Party results are compared to People's Alliance totals in the 1987 election.

=== L'Hospitalet de Llobregat ===
Population: 276,198

← Summary of the 26 May 1991 City Council of L'Hospitalet de Llobregat election results →
Parties and alliances	Popular vote			Seats	
Parties and alliances	Votes	%	±pp	Total	+/−
Socialists' Party of Catalonia (PSC–PSOE)	57,265	55.27	−2.50	17	±0
Convergence and Union (CiU)	16,115	15.55	+1.37	5	+1
Initiative for Catalonia (IC)	12,333	11.90	+1.37	3	±0
People's Party (PP)^{1}	8,811	8.50	+1.71	2	+1
Democratic and Social Centre (CDS)	2,464	2.38	−4.99	0	−2
The Greens Ecologist–Humanist List (LVLE–H)^{2}	2,215	2.14	+1.48	0	±0
Republican Left of Catalonia (ERC)	1,474	1.42	New	0	±0
Party of the Communists of Catalonia (PCC)	1,361	1.31	New	0	±0
Workers' Socialist Party (PST)	667	0.64	New	0	±0
Left Platform (PCE (m–l)–CRPE)	101	0.10	New	0	±0
Blank ballots	799	0.77	−0.20		
Total	103,605			27	±0
Valid votes	103,605	99.68	+0.80		
Invalid votes	328	0.32	−0.80		
Votes cast / turnout	103,933	48.05	−16.10		
Abstentions	112,353	51.95	+16.10		
Registered voters	216,286				
Sources
Footnotes: ^{1} People's Party results are compared to the combined totals of People's Alliance and People's Democratic Party in the 1987 election.; ^{2} The Greens Ecologist–Humanist List results are compared to Humanist Platform totals in the 1987 election.

=== Lleida ===
Population: 111,825

← Summary of the 26 May 1991 City Council of Lleida election results →
Parties and alliances	Popular vote			Seats	
Parties and alliances	Votes	%	±pp	Total	+/−
Socialists' Party of Catalonia (PSC–PSOE)	24,029	49.38	+12.07	17	+5
Convergence and Union (CiU)	12,453	25.59	−7.18	8	−3
People's Party (PP)^{1}	3,911	8.04	+0.67	2	±0
Initiative for Catalonia–Green Alternative (IC–AV)^{2}	2,400	4.93	−1.47	0	±0
Freixes Independent Group (Freixes)	2,349	4.83	−2.86	0	−2
Republican Left of Catalonia (ERC)	1,677	3.45	+0.65	0	±0
Democratic and Social Centre (CDS)	781	1.60	−2.62	0	±0
Party of the Communists of Catalonia (PCC)	333	0.68	New	0	±0
Group of Independents, Progressives and Nationalists (AIPN)	79	0.16	New	0	±0
Blank ballots	649	1.33	+0.34		
Total	48,661			27	±0
Valid votes	48,661	99.24	−0.17		
Invalid votes	374	0.76	+0.17		
Votes cast / turnout	49,035	56.22	−8.40		
Abstentions	38,180	43.78	+8.40		
Registered voters	87,215				
Sources
Footnotes: ^{1} People's Party results are compared to the combined totals of People's Alliance and People's Democratic Party in the 1987 election.; ^{2} Initiative for Catalonia–Green Alternative results are compared to the combined totals of Initiative for Catalonia and Green Alternative–Ecologist Movement of Catalonia in the 1987 election.

=== Mataró ===
Population: 101,882

← Summary of the 26 May 1991 City Council of Mataró election results →
Parties and alliances	Popular vote			Seats	
Parties and alliances	Votes	%	±pp	Total	+/−
Socialists' Party of Catalonia (PSC–PSOE)	19,073	42.23	−3.13	13	−1
Convergence and Union (CiU)	16,145	35.75	+2.20	11	±0
Initiative for Catalonia (IC)	4,206	9.31	+2.39	2	±0
People's Party (PP)^{1}	2,582	5.72	+1.30	1	+1
Green Union (UVE)	1,074	2.38	New	0	±0
Republican Left of Catalonia (ERC)	638	1.41	−1.76	0	±0
Democratic and Social Centre (CDS)	535	1.18	−2.60	0	±0
Left Proposal for Catalonia (PEC)	367	0.81	New	0	±0
Free Catalonia (CLL)	287	0.64	New	0	±0
Blank ballots	258	0.57	−0.19		
Total	45,165			27	±0
Valid votes	45,165	99.73	+0.65		
Invalid votes	122	0.27	−0.65		
Votes cast / turnout	45,287	59.33	−9.04		
Abstentions	31,042	40.67	+9.04		
Registered voters	76,329				
Sources
Footnotes: ^{1} People's Party results are compared to People's Alliance totals in the 1987 election.

=== Reus ===
Population: 86,407

← Summary of the 26 May 1991 City Council of Reus election results →
Parties and alliances	Popular vote			Seats	
Parties and alliances	Votes	%	±pp	Total	+/−
Socialists' Party of Catalonia (PSC–PSOE)	15,780	44.28	+3.90	13	+2
Convergence and Union (CiU)	11,815	33.16	+2.19	10	+2
Republican Left of Catalonia (ERC)	2,134	5.99	−1.93	1	−1
People's Party (PP)^{1}	2,116	5.94	−2.19	1	−1
Initiative for Catalonia (IC)	1,604	4.50	−1.11	0	−1
Party of the Communists of Catalonia (PCC)	987	2.77	New	0	±0
Ecologist Party of Catalonia–VERDE (PEC–VERDE)	781	2.19	New	0	±0
Democratic and Social Centre (CDS)	n/a	n/a	−6.07	0	−1
Blank ballots	417	1.17	+0.24		
Total	35,634			25	±0
Valid votes	35,634	99.57	+0.55		
Invalid votes	154	0.43	−0.55		
Votes cast / turnout	35,788	55.34	−4.34		
Abstentions	28,882	44.66	+4.34		
Registered voters	64,670				
Sources
Footnotes: ^{1} People's Party results are compared to People's Alliance totals in the 1987 election.

=== Sabadell ===
Population: 192,142

← Summary of the 26 May 1991 City Council of Sabadell election results →
Parties and alliances	Popular vote			Seats	
Parties and alliances	Votes	%	±pp	Total	+/−
Initiative for Catalonia (IC)	36,990	48.94	+1.94	15	+1
Convergence and Union (CiU)	14,931	19.75	−2.62	6	−1
Socialists' Party of Catalonia (PSC–PSOE)	14,043	18.58	−1.41	6	±0
People's Party (PP)^{1}	3,355	4.44	+1.00	0	±0
Left Proposal for Catalonia–Party of the Communists of Catalonia (PEC–PCC)	1,685	2.23	New	0	±0
Republican Left of Catalonia (ERC)	1,645	2.18	+0.48	0	±0
Independent and Citizen Alternative Candidacy (CAIC)	932	1.23	New	0	±0
Democratic and Social Centre (CDS)	559	0.74	−2.06	0	±0
Evangelical Social Action Party (PASE)	405	0.54	New	0	±0
Revolutionary Workers' Party of Spain (PORE)	301	0.40	−0.02	0	±0
Catalan Left (EC)	138	0.18	New	0	±0
Blank ballots	598	0.79	−0.08		
Total	75,582			27	±0
Valid votes	75,582	99.69	+0.30		
Invalid votes	238	0.31	−0.30		
Votes cast / turnout	75,820	52.27	−20.31		
Abstentions	69,244	47.73	+20.31		
Registered voters	145,064				
Sources
Footnotes: ^{1} People's Party results are compared to People's Alliance totals in the 1987 election.

=== Sant Boi de Llobregat ===
Population: 78,882

← Summary of the 26 May 1991 City Council of Sant Boi de Llobregat election results →
Parties and alliances	Popular vote			Seats	
Parties and alliances	Votes	%	±pp	Total	+/−
Socialists' Party of Catalonia (PSC–PSOE)	14,869	52.29	−4.09	15	−2
Convergence and Union (CiU)	6,196	21.79	+2.65	6	+1
Initiative for Catalonia (IC)	4,350	15.30	+3.12	4	+1
People's Party (PP)^{1}	1,369	4.81	+0.81	0	±0
Party of the Communists of Catalonia (PCC)	607	2.13	New	0	±0
Republican Left of Catalonia (ERC)	394	1.39	New	0	±0
Democratic and Social Centre (CDS)	381	1.34	−2.92	0	±0
Alliance for the Republic (AxR)	63	0.22	New	0	±0
Blank ballots	207	0.73	−0.25		
Total	28,436			25	±0
Valid votes	28,436	99.63	+0.88		
Invalid votes	107	0.37	−0.88		
Votes cast / turnout	28,543	48.46	−15.98		
Abstentions	30,363	51.54	+15.98		
Registered voters	58,906				
Sources
Footnotes: ^{1} People's Party results are compared to People's Alliance totals in the 1987 election.

=== Sant Cugat del Vallès ===
Population: 39,316

← Summary of the 26 May 1991 City Council of Sant Cugat del Vallès election results →
Parties and alliances	Popular vote			Seats	
Parties and alliances	Votes	%	±pp	Total	+/−
Convergence and Union (CiU)	7,692	47.37	+6.10	12	+3
Socialists' Party of Catalonia (PSC–PSOE)	3,650	22.48	−12.94	5	−3
Initiative for Catalonia (IC)	1,750	10.78	+2.10	2	±0
People's Party (PP)^{1}	1,296	7.98	−0.45	2	±0
Union of Independents (Ud'I)	660	4.06	New	0	±0
Republican Left of Catalonia (ERC)	636	3.92	−0.34	0	±0
Democratic and Social Centre (CDS)	255	1.57	New	0	±0
Alliance for the Republic (AxR)	34	0.21	New	0	±0
Blank ballots	265	1.63	+0.50		
Total	16,238			21	±0
Valid votes	16,238	99.44	+0.51		
Invalid votes	92	0.56	−0.51		
Votes cast / turnout	16,330	56.40	−11.59		
Abstentions	12,622	43.60	+11.59		
Registered voters	28,952				
Sources
Footnotes: ^{1} People's Party results are compared to People's Alliance totals in the 1987 election.

=== Santa Coloma de Gramenet ===
Population: 135,486

← Summary of the 26 May 1991 City Council of Santa Coloma de Gramenet election results →
Parties and alliances	Popular vote			Seats	
Parties and alliances	Votes	%	±pp	Total	+/−
Socialists' Party of Catalonia (PSC–PSOE)	21,896	43.41	+3.17	13	+1
Initiative for Catalonia (IC)	20,396	40.44	−4.06	12	−1
Convergence and Union (CiU)	3,858	7.65	+0.36	2	±0
People's Party (PP)^{1}	1,527	3.03	+0.55	0	±0
Party of the Communists of Catalonia (PCC)	992	1.97	New	0	±0
The Greens Ecologist–Humanist List (LVLE–H)^{2}	480	0.95	+0.35	0	±0
Democratic and Social Centre (CDS)	454	0.90	−1.56	0	±0
Independent Association of Santa Coloma (AISC)	364	0.72	New	0	±0
Republican Left of Catalonia (ERC)	187	0.37	New	0	±0
Blank ballots	285	0.57	−0.08		
Total	50,439			27	±0
Valid votes	50,439	99.74	+0.44		
Invalid votes	133	0.26	−0.44		
Votes cast / turnout	50,572	49.51	−16.24		
Abstentions	51,578	50.49	+16.24		
Registered voters	102,150				
Sources
Footnotes: ^{1} People's Party results are compared to People's Alliance totals in the 1987 election.; ^{2} The Greens Ecologist–Humanist List results are compared to Humanist Platform totals in the 1987 election.

=== Tarragona ===
Population: 112,360

← Summary of the 26 May 1991 City Council of Tarragona election results →
Parties and alliances	Popular vote			Seats	
Parties and alliances	Votes	%	±pp	Total	+/−
Convergence and Union (CiU)	22,627	44.10	+11.76	14	+4
Socialists' Party of Catalonia (PSC–PSOE)	17,844	34.78	−2.55	11	−1
People's Party (PP)^{1}	4,429	8.63	−1.18	2	−1
Green Alternative–Ecologist Movement of Catalonia (AV–MEC)	1,960	3.82	New	0	±0
Initiative for Catalonia (IC)	1,950	3.80	−0.21	0	±0
Republican Left of Catalonia (ERC)	1,612	3.14	+0.54	0	±0
Democratic and Social Centre (CDS)	560	1.09	−6.21	0	−2
Green Alternative (La Canonja)	0	0.00	New	0	±0
Canonginan Unity Group (AdUC)	0	0.00	New	0	±0
Blank ballots	323	0.63	−0.49		
Total	51,305			27	±0
Valid votes	51,305	99.70	+0.67		
Invalid votes	153	0.30	−0.67		
Votes cast / turnout	51,458	60.60	−3.56		
Abstentions	33,454	39.40	+3.56		
Registered voters	84,912				
Sources
Footnotes: ^{1} People's Party results are compared to People's Alliance totals in the 1987 election.

=== Terrassa ===
Population: 161,682

← Summary of the 26 May 1991 City Council of Terrassa election results →
Parties and alliances	Popular vote			Seats	
Parties and alliances	Votes	%	±pp	Total	+/−
Socialists' Party of Catalonia (PSC–PSOE)	30,455	47.90	−0.29	15	±0
Convergence and Union (CiU)	16,815	26.45	+1.78	8	±0
Initiative for Catalonia (IC)	5,237	8.24	−2.54	2	−1
People's Party (PP)^{1}	4,507	7.09	+1.81	2	+1
The Greens (EV)	2,241	3.53	New	0	±0
Republican Left of Catalonia (ERC)	1,786	2.81	−0.24	0	±0
Left Proposal for Catalonia–Party of the Communists of Catalonia (PEC–PCC)	1,120	1.76	New	0	±0
Democratic and Social Centre (CDS)	819	1.29	−3.19	0	±0
Alliance for the Republic (AxR)^{2}	70	0.11	New	0	±0
Blank ballots	524	0.82	−0.35		
Total	63,574			27	±0
Valid votes	63,574	99.63	+0.44		
Invalid votes	237	0.37	−0.44		
Votes cast / turnout	63,811	51.44	−13.21		
Abstentions	60,248	48.56	+13.21		
Registered voters	124,059				
Sources
Footnotes: ^{1} People's Party results are compared to People's Alliance totals in the 1987 election.
