= Per Catalunya! =

Catalan political magazine published in Cuba

Per Catalunya! ('For Catalonia') was a monthly publication issued from Havana, Cuba from 1942 to 1953. It was an organ of the Unified Socialist Party of Catalonia (PSUC), published in Catalan language. The majority of Catalan refugees in Cuba were members of the party. The first issue was published on May 10, 1942.

Pere Ardiaca was the director of Per Catalunya!. Ardiaca had edited the Barcelona party organ Treball before the exile. Andreu Serra was the editor of the publication. In 1946 Josep Forné Farreres took over the reins as director of Per Catalunya!. Ardiaca left Cuba, possibly around 1947. During its early phase the administration of Per Catalunya! was managed by Agustí Cid. Later Amanci Martínez took over as administrator of the publication. Writers in Per Catalunya! included Rito Esteban (writer in the column 'International Panorama'), Vicente Bernades, Aurelio Ballenilla, Francisco Fabregas Vehil, Jacinto Mas Torres, Juan Ambou, Ramón Medina Tur, José Luis Galbe, Juan Marinello, Emilio Roig de Leuchsenring, Néstor Almendros and Enric Soliva.

Per Catalunya! confronted the anti-communist elements controlling the Catalan Centre in Cuba, and in its pages it launched attacks against the leaders of this institution. However, in March 1944 La Nova Catalunya (publication of the Catalan Centre) and Per Catalunya! began producing a joint radio broadcast, Catalunya parla ('Catalonia speaks').

The 116th and last issue of Per Catalunya! was published in March 1953. The last director of Per Catalunya!, Andreu Serra, was detained by the Cuban government in September the same year.
