= Collectives of Young Communists – Communist Youth =

Collectives of Young Communists – Communist Youth (Col·lectius de Joves Comunistes - Joventut Comunista), more known simply as "CJC" or "Joventut Comunista", is the youth wing of the Party of the Communists of Catalonia (Partit dels i les Comunistes de Catalunya), the main communist party in Catalonia (Spain). It is the largest Catalan communist youth organization created as a result of the PCC foundation after the struggle within former PSUC in 1982. It continues the historical line of the Communist Youth of Catalonia (Joventut Comunista de Catalunya, JCC).

CJC-Joventut Comunista has its own publication, Revolució, and holds a festival every year called Festa Revolució.

It is divided in different sectors or federations, such as University, Young Woman, Youth and Work, and the territorial collectives. CJC-Joventut Comunista also has a federation for international brigadists, called Brigadists Movement (Moviment de Brigadistes), which organises travels of solidarity and cooperation in Cuba (brigade Dolores Ibárruri), Venezuela (brigade Simón Bolívar), and in the Sahara (brigade Sahara Hora). It maintains international contact with main communist or left-wing youth organizations of the world, and is member of the World Federation of Democratic Youth.

== See also ==
- Young Communists (Catalonia)
