= Living Unified Socialist Party of Catalonia =

Living Unified Socialist Party of Catalonia Partit Socialista Unificat de Catalunya viu
- Leader: Collective leadership (Central Committee)
- General Secretary: Eduard Navarro
- Founded: June 1997
- Split from: Unified Socialist Party of Catalonia
- Headquarters: Barcelona, Catalonia
- Newspaper: Nou Treball
- Youth wing: Unified Socialist Youth of Catalonia
- Ideology: Communism; Republicanism; Federalism
- Political position: Far-left
- Regional affiliation: United and Alternative Left (1998–2019); United Left Catalonia (since 2019)
- Colours: Red

Website
- http://psuc.org/

The Living Unified Socialist Party of Catalonia (PSUC viu, lit. "Living PSUC") is a political party in Catalonia, Spain. PSUC viu emerged from internal conflicts within the Unified Socialist Party of Catalonia (PSUC) during the mid-1990s. Since 1936, PSUC (and later PSUC viu) have served as the Catalan affiliate of the Communist Party of Spain (PCE). PSUC and PSUC viu have functioned as parallel parties of the PCE, and the latter does not maintain its own organizational structure in Catalonia.

== History ==
In the 1980s, PCE and PSUC developed in different ways. Just as PCE took part in setting up the United Left (IU) coalition, PSUC had launched the coalition Initiative for Catalonia (IC). But whereas PCE maintained its character as an independent party, PSUC gradually became a dormant structure within IC. The party leadership of PSUC worked towards converting IC into a political party and dissolving PSUC into it. In January 1990, a national conference of PSUC was held, which decided that the political action of PSUC would be carried out within the framework of IC. Likewise a decision was taken on a Central Committee meeting of PSUC on 22 March 1991 that all PSUC members automatically would be members of IC. The 8th congress of PSUC was supposed to have been held in 1992, but was never convoked.

In 1995, the tradition of holding the Festa de Treball, an annual public event of the PSUC organ Treball, was cancelled by IC, allegedly on grounds of lack of finances. At the 4th national conference of IC, held in November 1996, the internal opposition within PSUC raised their voice. The group around 'Manifesto for PSUC' was organized as the Red, Green and Violet Collective (Col·lectiu Roig, Verd i Violeta). The opposition grouped around the Manifesto wanted to maintain PSUC as a separate communist party and was IC as a strategic front of the party. The opposition launched, for the first time, their own alternative candidate for the presidency of IC, Ramon Luque.

The 8th congress of PSUC was finally convoked for 10 May 1997. At the congress, the group around the Manifesto was defeated, and PSUC ceased to function as an independent party. The minority then left PSUC and IC, and by June the same year they had reorganized themselves as PSUC viu. Quickly PCE recognized PSUC viu as their new Catalan referent. Parallel to this, the other main communist party in Catalonia, the Party of the Communists of Catalonia (PCC, which had formed part of IC but left it), called for unity amongst the Catalan communists.

In 1998, a new coalition was constructed by PSUC viu and PCC, the United and Alternative Left (EUiA). EUiA became the new Catalan referent of IU. However, the founding of EUiA was by no means uncomplicated as the founders of PSUC viu had belonged to opposing factions in the intense inner-party conflicts in PSUC in the early 1980s. At that time, the founders of PSUC viu had been aligned with the Eurocommunist majority. That conflict ended with the departure of the pro-Soviet faction and their creation of PCC.

Although PSUC viu is an independent party, it takes part in PCE congresses as a PCE regional federation. Members of PCE who move to Catalonia become members of PSUC viu and, likewise, members of PSUC viu who settle anywhere else in Spain become members of PCE.

The central organ of PSUC viu is Nou Treball. The youth wing of the party was the Young Communists (JC), although following its 2014 dissolution it was again reconstituted in 2015 as JSUC (Joventut Socialista Unificada de Catalunya).

PSUC viu works for the establishment of a democratic and federal republic in Spain, in which different nationalities were given the right to self-determination. In its 2017 congress, PSUC viu elected Eduard Navarro as general secretary, and the party included again Marxism–Leninism as its core identity.
