= United and Alternative Left =

United and Alternative Left Esquerra Unida i Alternativa
- General Secretary: Mercedes Vidal Lago
- Founded: 1998
- Merger of: Party of the Communists of Catalonia; Living Unified Socialist Party of Catalonia; Revolutionary Workers' Party
- Split from: Initiative for Catalonia Greens
- Headquarters: C/Doctor Aiguader,10; 08003 Barcelona
- Ideology: Socialism; Communism; Catalan self-determination; Republicanism
- Political position: Left-wing
- National affiliation: United Left (1998–2019)
- Regional affiliation: ICV–EUiA (2003–2015); Catalunya Sí que es Pot (2015–2017); En Comú Podem (2015–2019) (Note: Since 2017 integrated within Catalunya en Comú); Catalunya en Comú (2017–2019); Republican Left of Catalonia (since 2023)
- European affiliation: Party of the European Left; European Anti-Capitalist Left
- Colours: Crimson
- Congress of Deputies: 0 / 350
- Senate: 0 / 266
- European Parliament: 0 / 61

Website
- semprealesquerra.cat

United and Alternative Left (Catalan: Esquerra Unida i Alternativa, EUiA) is a political party in Catalonia, Spain. EUiA has 4000 members, and until 2019 was the Catalan correspondent of the Spain-wide United Left (IU).

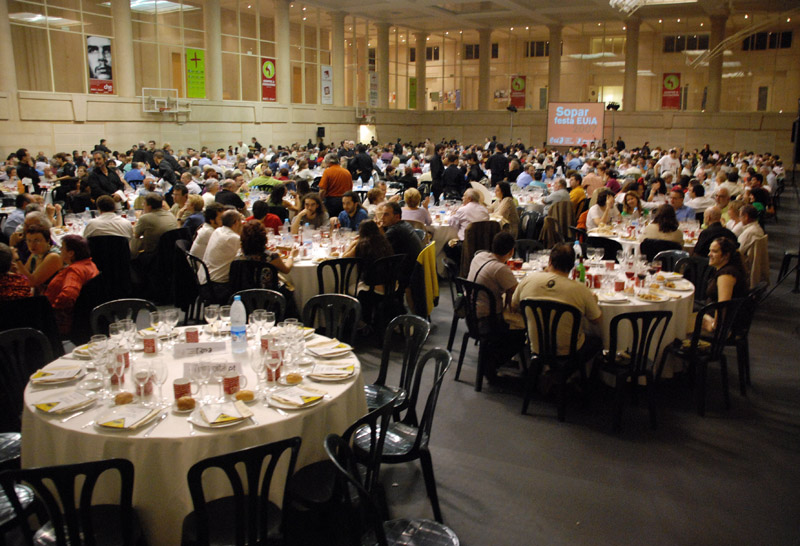
Annual EUiA dinner party, 2007

It was formed in 1998 as a schism from Initiative for Catalonia Greens (ICV). It comprises an alliance of Party of the Communists of Catalonia, Living Unified Socialist Party of Catalonia, POR, PRT-IR, PASOC, CEA, and CLI. After competing in a series of elections with their former colleagues at Iniciativa, the two parties agreed to run together as an electoral coalition. In 2015, the party joined the electoral coalition En Comú Podem. In 2017, it was one of the founding parties of Catalunya en Comú, being expelled from the organization two years later as it was no longer the Catalan correspondent of United Left. Since 2023 it has participated in the Republican Left of Catalonia lists at the local level.

== Composition ==
=== Current members ===
Party	Notes
Communists of Catalonia (Comunistes.Cat)	Founded in November 2014.

=== Former members ===
Party	Notes
Party of the Communists of Catalonia (PCC)	Dissolved in November 2014.
Living Unified Socialist Party of Catalonia (PSUC viu)	Left in June 2019 for United Left Catalonia.
La Aurora Marxist Organization (La Aurora (OM))	Left in June 2019 for United Left Catalonia.

== Electoral performance ==
=== Parliament of Catalonia ===
Date	Votes			Seats		Status	Size
Date	#	%	±pp	#	±	Status	Size
1999	44,454	1.4%	—	0 / 135	—	N/A	6th
2003	241,163	7.3%	+5.9	1 / 135	1	Government	*
2006	282,693	9.5%	+2.2	2 / 135	1	Government	*
2010	230,824	7.4%	–2.1	2 / 135	0	Opposition	*
2012	359,705	9.9%	+2.5	3 / 135	1	Opposition	*
2015	367,613	8.9%	–1.0	1 / 135	2	Opposition	**
2017	326,360	7.5%	–1.4	1 / 135	0	Opposition	***

- * Within Initiative for Catalonia Greens–United and Alternative Left.
- ** Within Catalunya Sí que es Pot.
- *** Within Catalunya en Comú–Podem.

=== Cortes Generales ===
==== Catalonia ====
Congress of Deputies
Date	Votes			Seats		Size
Date	#	%	±pp	#	±	Size
2000	75,019	2.2%	—	0 / 46	–	6th
2004	234,790	5.8%	+3.6	0 / 47	0	*
2008	183,338	4.9%	–0.9	0 / 47	0	*
2011	280,152	8.1%	+3.2	1 / 47	1	*
2015	929,880	24.7%	+16.6	2 / 47	1	**
2016	853,102	24.5%	–0.2	2 / 47	0	**

Senate
Date	Seats		Size
Date	#	±	Size
2000	0 / 16	—	4th
2004	0 / 16	0	***
2008	0 / 16	0	***
2011	0 / 16	0	***
2015	0 / 16	0	**
2016	0 / 16	0	**

- * Within Initiative for Catalonia Greens–United and Alternative Left.
- ** Within En Comú Podem.
- *** Within Catalan Agreement of Progress.

=== European Parliament ===
Spain
Date	Votes			Seats		Size
Date	#	%	±pp	#	±	Size
1999	1,221,565	5.8%	–	0 / 64	–	*
2004	643,136	4.1%	–1.7	0 / 54	0	*
2009	588,241	3.7%	–0.4	0 / 54	0	**
2014	1,575,308	10.0%	+6.3	0 / 54	0	***

Catalonia
Date	Votes			Size
Date	#	%	±pp	Size
1999	58,977	2.0%	–	6th
2004	151,871	7.2%	+5.2	****
2009	119,755	6.1%	–1.1	****
2014	259,152	10.3%	+4.2	****

- * Within United Left.
- ** Within The Left.
- *** Within Plural Left.
- **** Within Initiative for Catalonia Greens–United and Alternative Left.

== See also ==
- List of political parties in Catalonia
