= Young Communists (Catalonia) =

Young Communists (in Catalan: Joves Comunistes) was the youth wing of PSUC viu in Catalonia, Spain. It was initially known as Joves Comunistes del PSUC viu. JC published Veu Rebel. JC was a federated organisation to the Communist Youth Union of Spain(UJCE) since April 2006 up to its dissolution into the Communist Youth of Catalonia.

The highest organ of JC was the Congress. The Congress elected a Central Committee that lead the organization between congresses. Out of the Central Committee a Standing Committee was elected, which ran the day-to-day affairs of the organization. The las general secretary of JC was Benjamí Moles.

== See also ==
- Collectives of Young Communists – Communist Youth
