= Pere Ardiaca =

Pere Ardiaca i Martí (1909 in Balaguer, Lleida Province – 5 November 1986 in Moscow) was a Spanish Catalan communist politician. In 1982, he, Marià Pere, Josep Serradell and dozens of other communist leaders founded the Party of the Communists of Catalonia (PCC). He was its president until his death.

== Biography ==
In 1926 he moved to Barcelona, where he worked as a painter decorator until 1929 where he was forced to emigrate to France, because he refused military service. There he joined the French Communist Party (PCF) in the locality of Besiers. Later he was a selected to represent a local committee in Nîmes.

On the proclamation of the Second Spanish Republic, he returned to Spain and his native Balaguer, where he became affiliated with the Bloc Obrer i Camperol. In 1933 he left this group and joined the Communist Party of Catalonia, where in just a year later he became Political Secretary. This was short-lived after the events on October 6 of 1934 and he merged into the International Red Aid party.

In 1936 on the outbreak of the Spanish Civil War he was part of an Executive Committee for the Unified Socialist Party of Catalonia (PSUC) and appointed director of the magazine Treball is appointed. In 1937 he was in charge of propaganda for the eastern army commission. When the Spanish civil war was over he fled the country in exile and began a pilgrimage, first in France and then through the Spanish colonies in the Caribbean including Dominican Republic and Cuba.

In 1948 he returned and joined the PSUC, and in 1960 was an elected member of the Central Committee. He moved to Barcelona around 1960 where he being active in the Treball magazine that he had previously worked on at least 20 years earlier. In 1962 however, his actions were stopped and he was condemned to 21 years in prison, but was released in 1971 after being imprisoned in the 1960s.

After the death of Franco, he was a candidate for the first elections to the Parliament of Catalonia, and chosen deputy to congress for Lérida. In January 1981 he celebrated the 5th Congress of the PSUC where he became president, but was expelled in December of that same year together with other outstanding leaders to form the Party of the Communists of Catalonia in 1982 and was president until his death.

In his later years he spent time in Russia, where he died in Moscow, USSR, on November 5, 1986.
