= United Left Catalonia =

Catalonian left-wing political party

United Left Catalonia Esquerra Unida Catalunya
- Abbreviation: EUCat
- Spokesperson: Josep Montero
- Coordinators: Núria Lozano; Eduard Navarro
- Founded: 3 July 2019
- Split from: EUiA
- Ideology: Communism; Democratic socialism
- Political position: Left-wing to far-left
- National affiliation: United Left
- Regional affiliation: Catalunya en Comú
- Member parties: PSUC viu CC critical sector EUiA factions
- Colors: Red
- Anthem: The Internationale, Els Segadors
- Parliament of Catalonia: 1 / 135

Website
- esquerraunida.cat

United Left Catalonia (Catalan: Esquerra Unida Catalunya, EUCat) is the current regional branch of United Left (IU) in Catalonia. It was formed in July 2019, after IU suspended its collaboration with United and Alternative Left (EUiA) in June and subsequently expelled the party from its organization structure as a result of some EUiA members—including its leader Joan Josep Nuet—chose to break away from Catalunya en Comú in March 2019 into the Sobiranistes party, then ally themselves with Republican Left of Catalonia (ERC) ahead of the April 2019 Spanish general election.

The party held its constituent congress on 29 February 2020, and maintained EUiA's continuity as a member party of Catalunya en Comú. EUCat's promoters did not rule out a future recovery and reintegration of EUiA, which they considered as a "kidnapped" political space.
