= Carlos Floriano Corrales =

Spanish politician (born 1967)

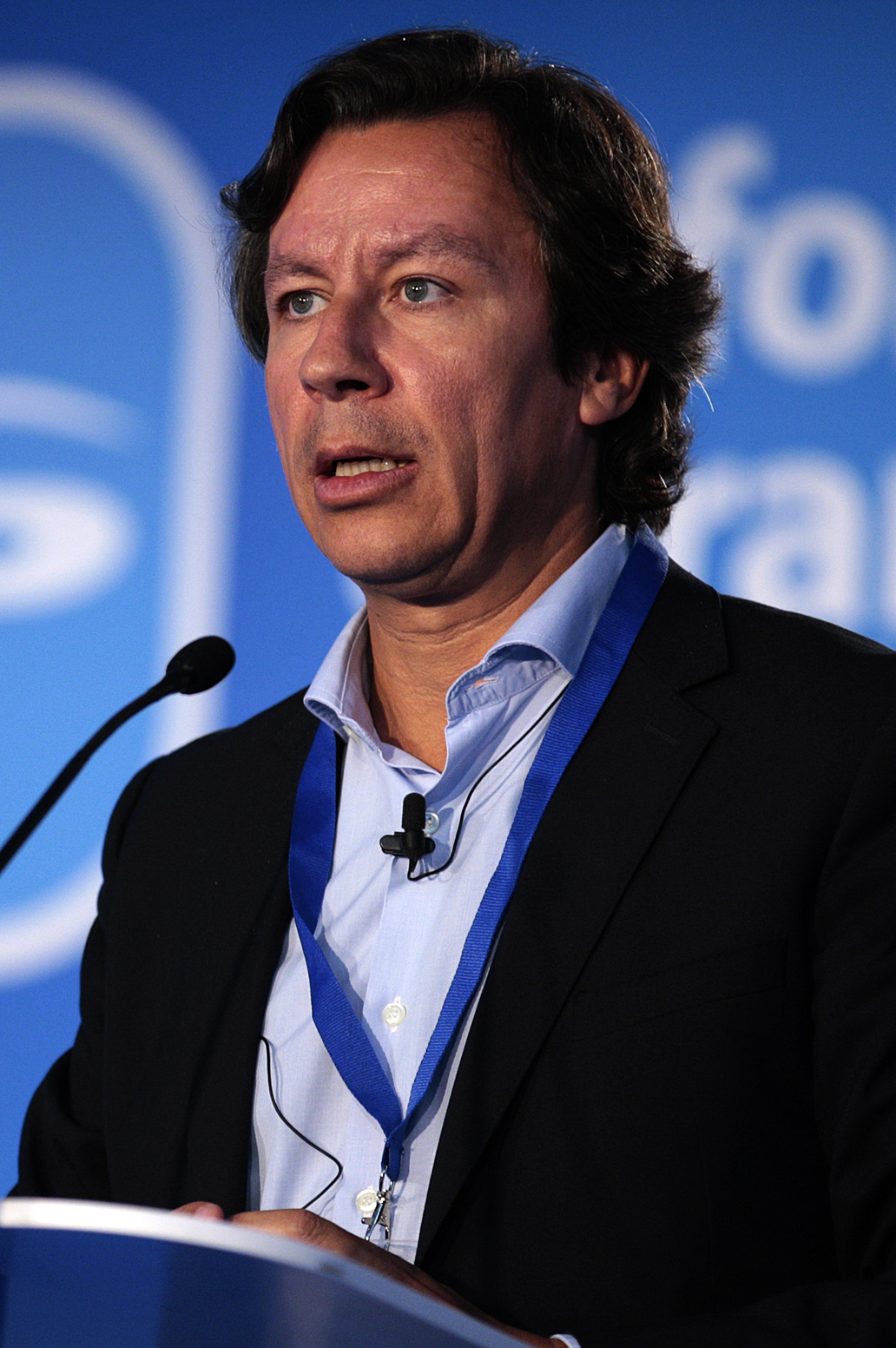

Carlos Floriano Corrales (Cáceres, 12 February 1967) is a People's Party (PP) politician who represents Cáceres Province in the Spanish Congress of Deputies, where he serves as a PP spokesman and coordinator of the party's economics group. Floriano was first elected at the 2008 general election. Previously, he had served four terms in the Assembly of Extremadura. From 2000 to 2008, he was leader of the PP's Extremadura regional branch, and served in the Senate of Spain during this period.
