= Party of the Communists of Catalonia =

Party of the Communists of Catalonia Partit dels i les Comunistes de Catalunya
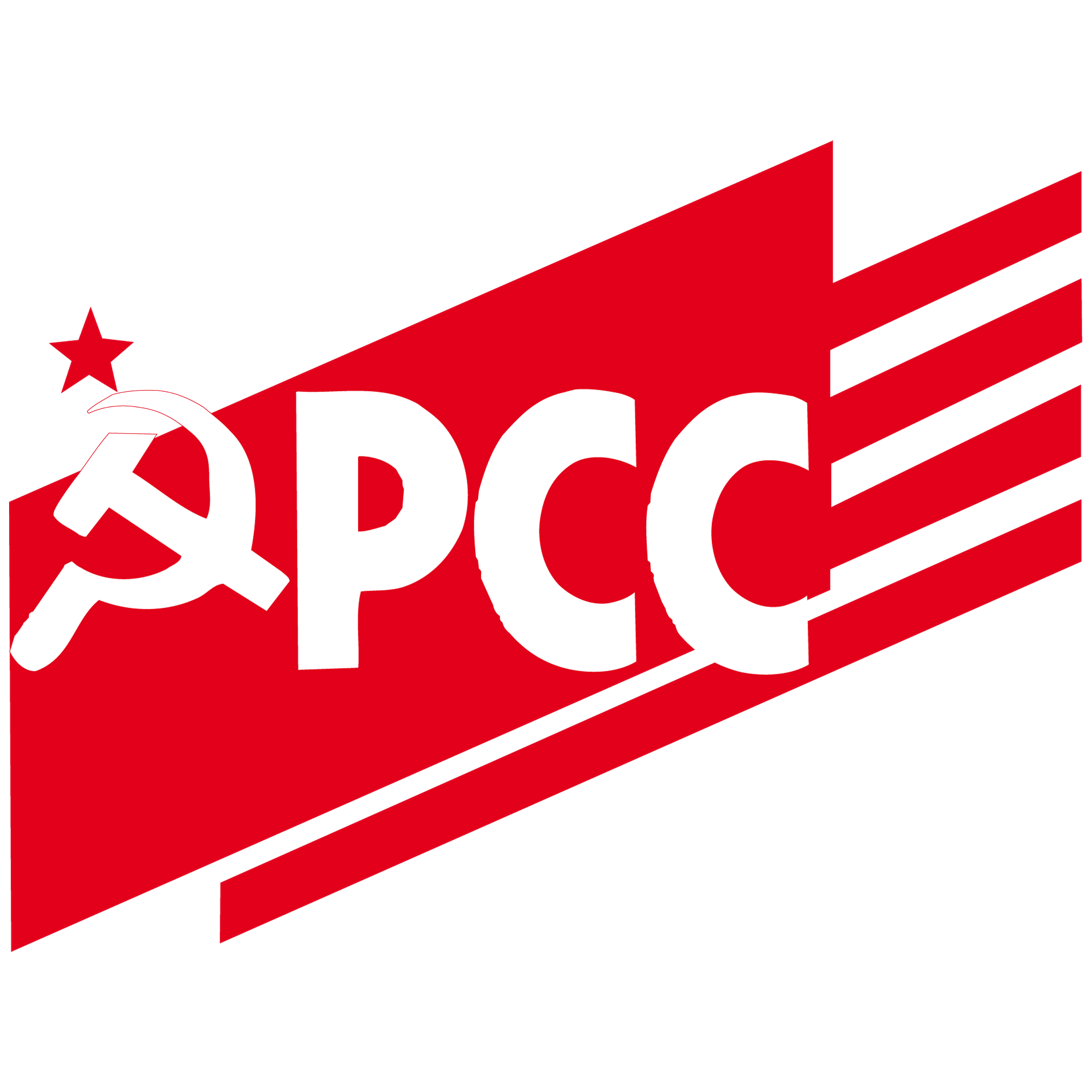
- President: Collective leadership (Central Committee)
- Founded: April 1982
- Dissolved: 1 November 2014
- Split from: Unified Socialist Party of Catalonia
- Succeeded by: Communists of Catalonia
- Youth wing: Joventut Comunista
- Ideology: Communism; Marxism–Leninism; Catalanism
- Political position: Far-left
- National affiliation: Communist Party of the Peoples of Spain (1984–1986)
- Regional affiliation: Initiative for Catalonia Greens (1987–1990, 1995–1997); United and Alternative Left (1998–2014)
- International affiliation: IMCWP
- Colours: Red

Party flag
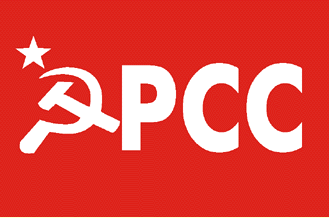
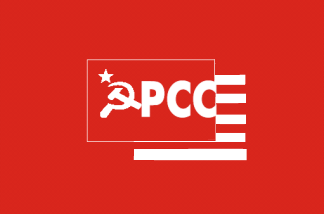

Website
- www.pcc.cat

Party of the Communists of Catalonia (Catalan: Partit dels i les Comunistes de Catalunya) was a Marxist-Leninist party in Catalonia that existed from 1982 to 2014. The main organ of PCC was Avant and the theoretical organ was Realitat. Every year the party used to hold a festival for its newspaper – Festa d'Avant. The youth wing of PCC was the Collectives of Young Communists – Communist Youth (Col·lectius de Joves Comunistes - Joventut Comunista).

PCC was formed in April 1982 by the pro-Soviet faction of the Unified Socialist Party of Catalonia (PSUC). The formation of PCC was the peak of a long and intense struggle within PSUC between the pro-Soviet and Eurocommunist sections of the party. The pro-Soviet section was often nicknamed 'Afghans' due to their support of the Soviet line of the war in Afghanistan. In December 1981 Pere Ardiaca, chairman of PSUC and leader of the pro-Soviet section, had been expelled from PSUC, accused of fractional activities. When PCC was constituted Ardiaca was elected chairman of the new party.

In 1984 PCC merged into the Communist Party (later renamed the Communist Party of the Peoples of Spain, PCPE), and it became its regional wing in Catalonia. However, the party soon broke the bonds to PCPE and reconstructed itself as an independent party. Instead, PCPE formed a new Catalan branch, the Communist Party of the Catalan People (Partit Comunista del Poble Català).

In 1987 PCC took part in the formation of Initiative for Catalonia (IC), a broad coalition of leftwing parties led by PSUC. In 1989 it left IC. In the 1995 elections, it contested on IC lists as part of the electoral coalition of IC-Greens. In 1998 PCC and PSUC viu formed the United and Alternative Left (EUiA), which became the new Catalan referent of the Spanish United Left (IU) following the break between IU and IC. PCC is the largest party inside EUiA.

On 1 November 2014 the Party of the Communists of Catalonia agreed to its dissolution as a political party and the transfer of all its human, political and material capital to a new unitary organization – Communists of Catalonia.
