= La Aurora Marxist Organization =

La Aurora Marxist Organization La Aurora Organización Marxista
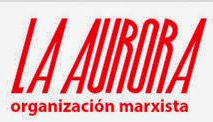
- Leader: Francesc Matas Salla
- Founded: 1974
- Headquarters: Barcelona
- Newspaper: Sin Muro; L'Aurora
- Youth wing: Revolutionary Youth of Spain
- Ideology: Communism; Trotskyism
- Political position: Far-left
- National affiliation: United Left (since 1998)
- Regional affiliation: United Left Catalonia (since 2019); United and Alternative Left (1998–2019)
- Colors: Red

Website
- lauroraom.es

La Aurora Marxist Organization (Spanish: La Aurora Organización Marxista; La Aurora (OM)) is a Spanish far-left group. It was founded in 1974 as the radical Anti-Francoist Revolutionary Workers' Party of Spain (Partido Obrero Revolucionario de España, PORE). In 1993 it was renamed as the Revolutionary Workers' Party (Partido Obrero Revolucionario, POR). Since 1998, the party has been part of United Left (IU) through the internal groups known as Redes and Bastidas. At its 20th Congress, held in 2013, it changed its name to La Aurora Marxist Organization.

== History ==
The party was led by Aníbal Ramos (Arturo van den Eynde) for thirty years. Its clandestine phase in Francoist Spain was characterized by ferocious persecution by the Spanish police and the arrest and torture of many of its members. In order to avoid extensive arrests PORE organized itself in tight cells.

The radicalism of this group did not abate after the caudillo's death, as PORE steadfastly opposed the Spanish transition to democracy which it saw as a mere continuation of Francoism. It also opposed the reformist policies of the government of Felipe González as well as the government crackdown of the terrorist separatist organisation Basque National Liberation Movement, being one of the first to cry foul during the so-called guerra sucia.

PORE was renamed POR in 1983, eight years after the beginning of the political transition. In 2013 it was renamed to La Aurora Marxist Organization. This party keeps decentralized sections only in Catalonia, being part of Esquerra Unida i Alternativa (EUiA) as the Bastida faction. In the Basque Country a sector of POR that was integrated in Ezker Batua-Berdeak (EB-B) through Erabaki abandoned the coalition in 2011 in order to ask the vote for Amaiur; meanwhile another sector kept within EB-B as the Sarea/Redes faction. In 2013, it changed its name to La Aurora Marxist Organization.

Internationally, it was part of the Fourth International. Its main publications are Sin Muro in Spanish and L'Aurora (Dawn) in the Catalan language.
