= Saint Candidus (Ayne Bru) =

Painting by Ayne Bru

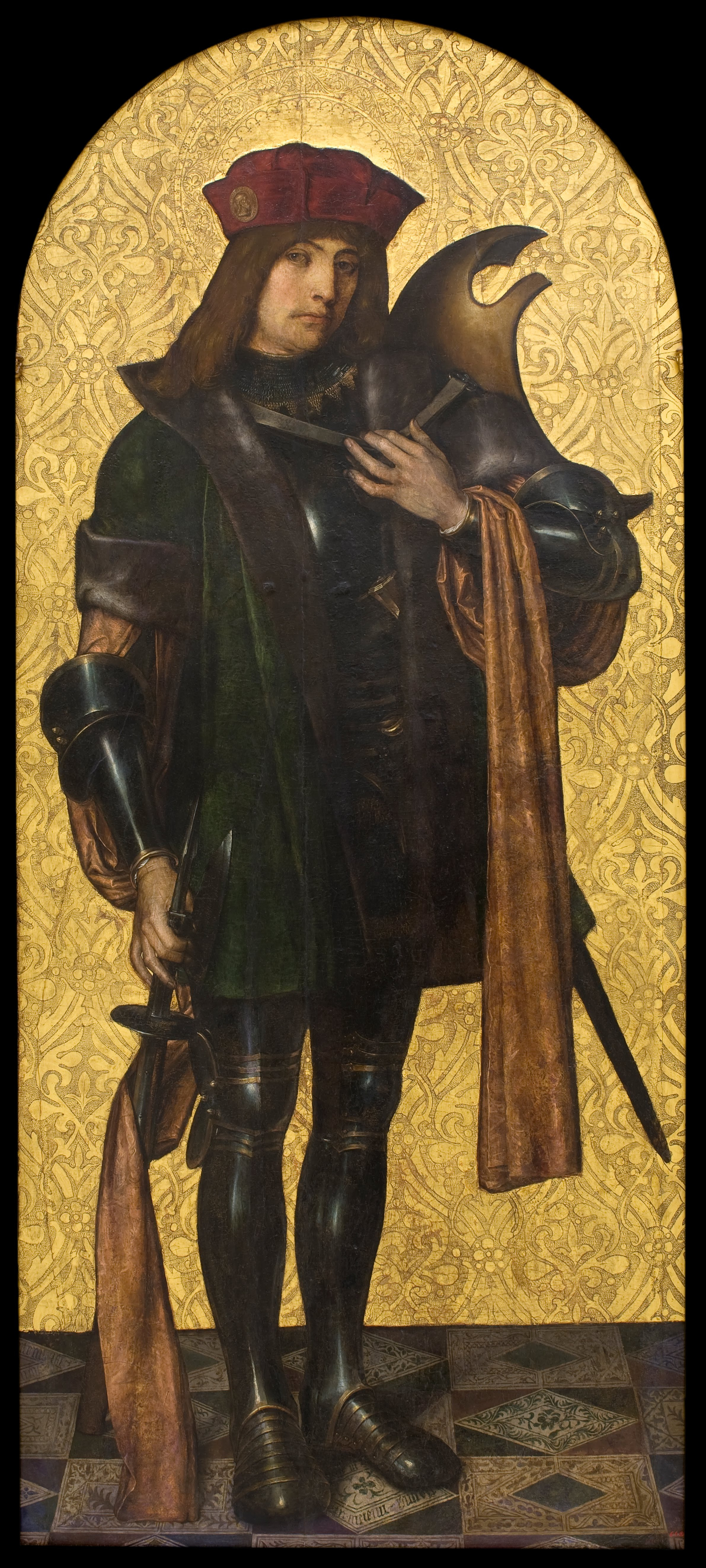
- Artist: Ayne Bru
- Year: 1502–1507
- Type: Oil, stucco reliefs and gold leaf on wood
- Dimensions: 182 cm × 88 cm (72 in × 35 in)
- Location: Museu Nacional d'Art de Catalunya; Barcelona

Saint Candidus is a painting by Ayne Bru, conserved at the National Art Museum of Catalonia.

== Description ==
The knight, standing, is dressed in dark armour with a shield, halberd and sword, a fur-lined green tabard, a purple stole and a red cap with a medal featuring the bust of Christ. This is Saint Candidus, a warrior in the Theban legion who was martyred along with Saint Maurice. Like the panel of the Martyrdom of Saint Cucuphas, this painting was part of the old high altarpiece in the monastery of Sant Cugat del Vallès. Ayne Bru, one of the most important names from the Catalan Cinquecento, was a painter of Central-European origin and training whose work speaks for the influence of Flemish culture and of the art produced in Venice in the period straddling the fifteenth and sixteenth centuries.
