= Altarpiece of Alella =

Design for an altarpiece by Antoni Gaudí

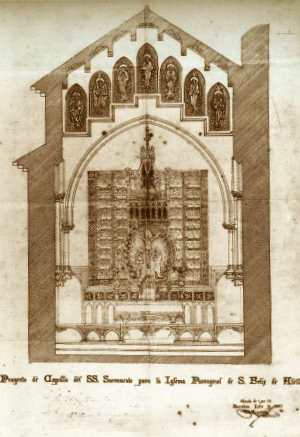
The project for the altarpiece of the Crucifixion for the Chapel of the Holy Sacrament for the Parochial Church of Sant Feliu (Saint Felix) of Alella, conserved in the Parish File, designed and signed by Antoni Gaudí.

The Altarpiece of Alella is an altarpiece by the Catalan architect Antoni Gaudí that is part of the project of the chapel of the Holy Sacrament commissioned in 1883 by the Rector Jaume Puig i Claret for the parish church of Sant Feliu (Saint Felix) in Alella. It became known by a drawing preserved in the parochial archive found in 1959, delineated with India ink in two colours and showing Gaudí's signature, published for the first time in the same year. A reproduction was included the book Gaudí by George R. Collins the following year which was transcendent for the worldwide diffusion of the work of the architect of Reus as it was the first monograph dedicated to him in English language.

The drawing at issue is the cross section of a chapel attached to the church of Sant Feliu. The altar and its altarpiece are placed in the apse of the chapel behind a pointed arc with seven stained glass windows. The altarpiece has a flat panel shape with marked Gothic inspiration, sculptural figures ahead and the main motif representing the crucifixion guarded under a canopy. Neither the altarpiece nor the chapel designed by Gaudí came to be built although the project was approved on by the Bishop of Barcelona, Jaume Català Albosa. Finally the chapel was built according to another project. Gaudí's plan was exhibited and reproduced several times.

In 1997, on the commission of the Town Hall of Alella, the altar and chapel were reconstructed following Gaudí's design using CAD programs. This work was part of the Gaudí i Alella exhibition at the Centre Cultural Can Lleonard in 1999, including a model of the chapel and the altarpiece.

== Description ==
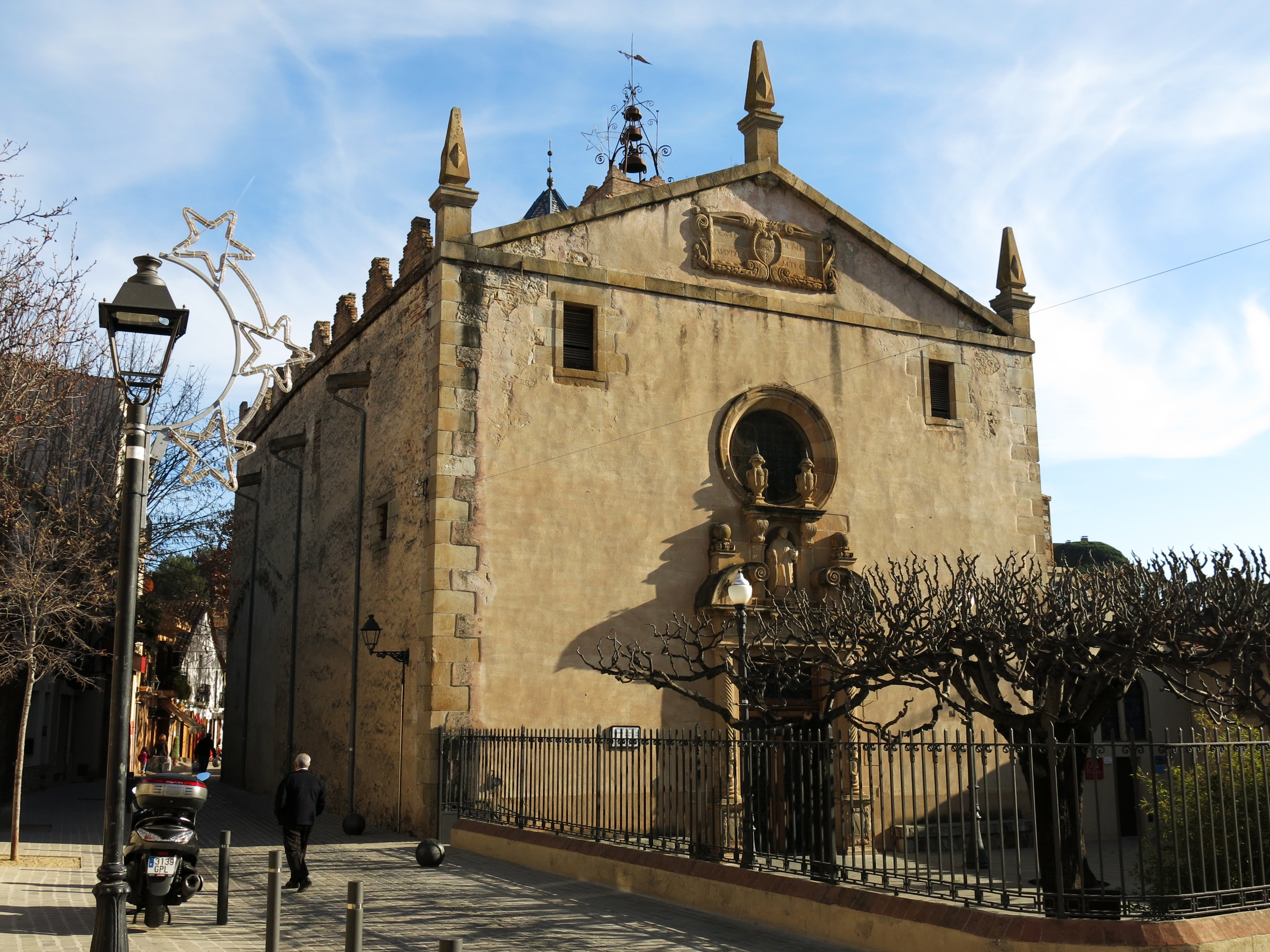
The parish (Saint Felix) in Alella.

The altarpiece is a square table placed over a decorated with pointed arches pedestal with a frieze of medallions representing vegetal and angels figures. In front it is placed the altar with the tabernacle also in ogival form. In the centre is the sculpture of the crucifixion surrounded by an almond-shaped figure from which rays emerge, under a canopy of fine gothic design in the form of a temple rotated 45 degrees, where guardian angels are placed. It tops in a cover with sharp slopes where a slender cross is placed crowning the altarpiece. The great table on which the whole is structured is framed by a delicate guard and is divided into four columns where the word Sanctus is repeated 36 times.

In the Gaudí's project the altarpiece was in the apse of the chapel preceded by an arch with seven staggered windows according to the ogival arch with figures of angels in the stained glasses. The chapel was covered with gable roof over wooden joists supported by ribbed pointed arches, a characteristic Catalan Gothic system of diaphragmatic arches and woody beams that can be seen for example in the Royal Chapel of Santa Águeda in Barcelona.

== Symbolism ==
In a 1983 article on the centenary of this project, Joan Bassegoda Nonell explained its symbolism, based on the Apocalypse of St. John. The seven angels in the windows of the arch are described in Chapter 8, Verse 2: "I saw seven angels standing before God, to whom were given seven trumpets." In chapter 4 St. John expressed that he saw four beings -lion, bull, eagle and man- repeating day and night prayer: Holy, Holy, Holy, is the Lord Almighty, who was, who is and who will come. In each of the four columns of the altarpiece can be read nine times the word Sanctus, equivalent to four times three repetitions of the triple prayer symbolizing this way this passage of the Apocalypse.

The central figure of the altar is the crucifixion with Christ in the cross and the Virgin and St. John at both sides composing the so-called Horizontal Trinity or Juanist Trinity. The group stands in front of the almond shaped form where rays of light emanate from the head of the Christ, forming the Elliptical Aura, a symbol of apotheosis and glory.

Thus the whole assembly of the chapel and the altarpiece formed a direct symbolism of the crucifixion and the interpretation of passages of the Apocalypse of St. John. The invocation of the Sanctus had been used shortly before by Gaudí in the watercolor drawing of a reliquary, preserved in the Reus museum, and the following year he will repeat it in the stained glass windows of the crypt of the Sagrada Familia temple. Bassegoda remarks that the student gate for a cemetery that Gaudí projected in 1875 contained numerous apocalyptic symbols.

Reconstruction project for the chapel and altarpiece of the Crucifixion for the parish church of Alella. Project carried out by Joan Bassegoda Nonell, Bibiana Sciortino and Mario Andruet, architects.

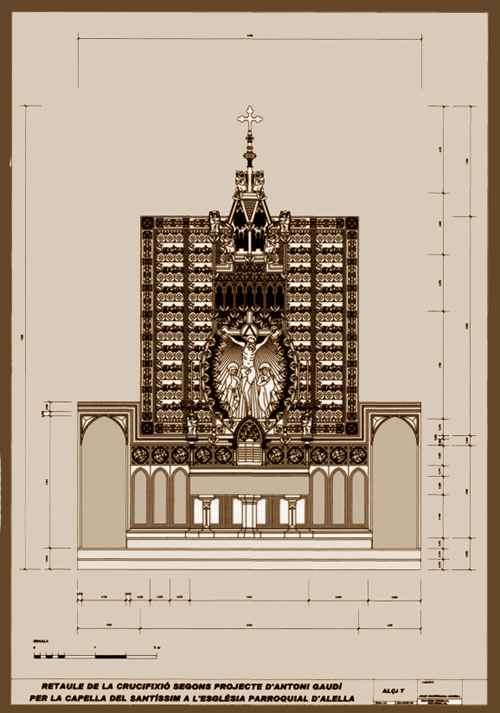

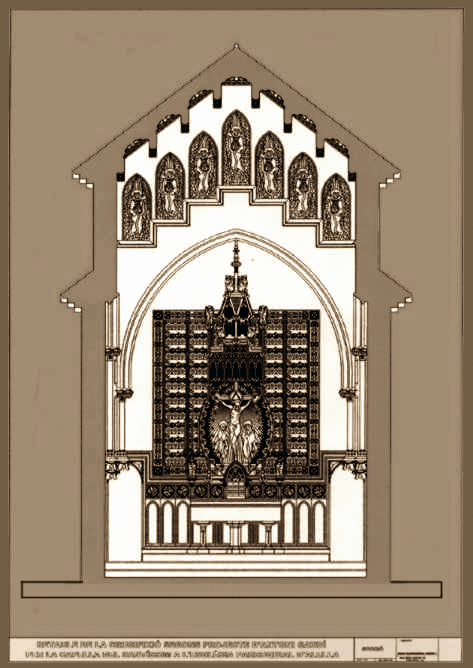

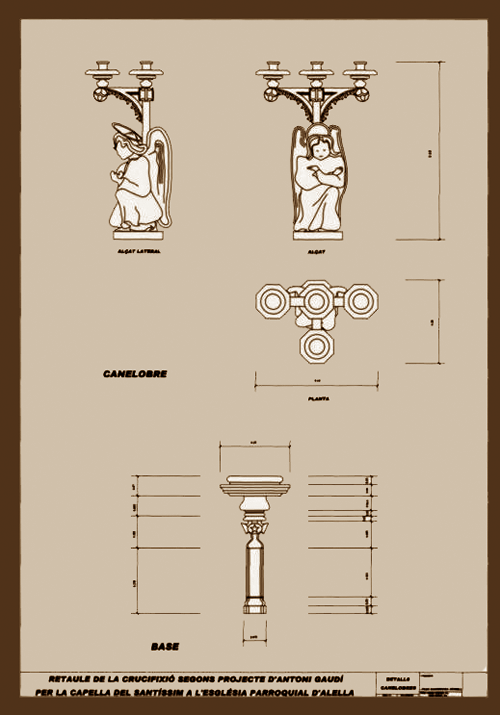

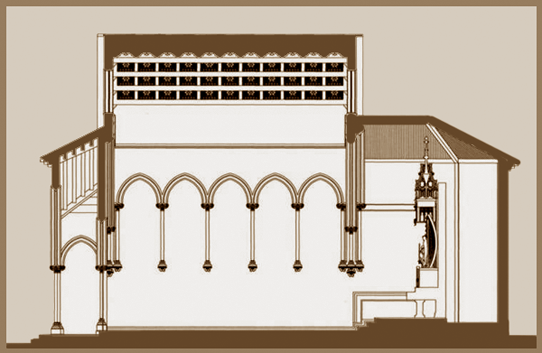

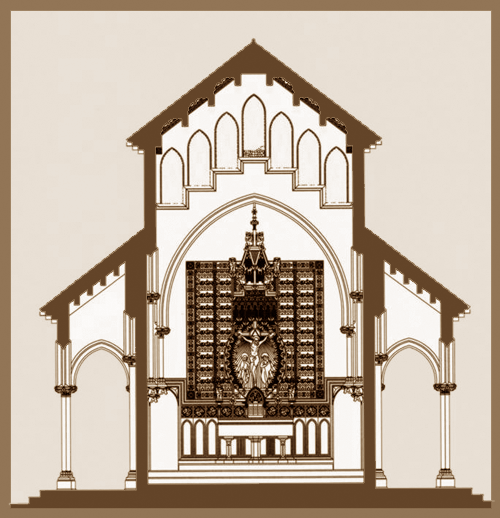

== Other Gaudí works in Alella ==
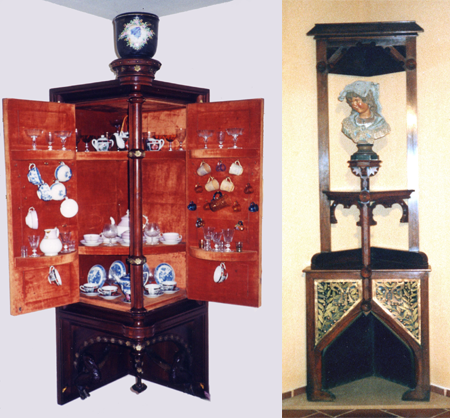
Furniture designed by Antoni Gaudí for the house that the Vicens family had in Alella.

Gaudí befriended Manuel Vicens Montaner since the commission of the famous Casa Vicens of Barcelona. As a result, he spent many summers of the 1880s in the residence that the Vicens family had in Alella, at the Carrer de Dalt (today Anselm Clavé street). Gaudí designed two pieces of furniture that remained in this house for many years, while Mr. Vicens' daughter lived there: a wooden and metal corner fireplace currently displayed in the Casa Vicens, with a great sculpture on a slender pedestal. Written on metal plate are shown the initials M.V. of Manuel Vicens. The other piece of furniture is a hanging wooden corner cabinet decorated with gold metal inlays. The interior faces of the doors have shelves to optimize the functionality of the small furniture. It is currently in a private house in Barcelona. This piece of furniture shows the initials D.G., of Dolors Giralt, Mr. Vicens's wife.

In the parish church of Alella there is another piece that can be attributed to Gaudí. It is the first section of the staircase of the romanesque bell tower, considered the most notable of its style in the coastal area of Catalonia, which received a modification in its initial section on the ground floor giving it curved shape with broken triangular floor steps so that each step allows to gain two heights, according to the Gothic system described and illustrated by Viollet-le-Duc that allows stairs with slopes of up to 45 degrees. Gaudí should be credited with having innovated on this scheme which applied only to straight stairs. By the same dates Gaudí was building a similar staircase in the stables of the Finca Güell, which seems to attribute to him that of the bell tower of Alella. Stairs with the same configuration were projected by Gaudí in the waterfall of the park of the Ciutadella in Barcelona when he collaborated with Joan Fontseré. In this case the structure was metallic, while the other two are made of bricks.

Finally may be related the wrought iron cross next to the altar of the church of Alella, whose shape is similar to the one that Gaudí drew in the design of the altar of the Crucifixion (in the drawing it is suggested since it is covered by the arch), and attributed to the architect too.

== See also ==
- Antoni Gaudí
  - List of Gaudí buildings
- Art Nouveau
- Modernisme
- Arquitectura de Barcelona (in Spanish)
- Güell Pavilions
- Casa Vicens
- Eugène Viollet-le-Duc

== Bibliography ==
- ARTÈS, SALVADOR and GALERA, LLUÍS (1959) Notes històriques de la parròquia de Sant Fellu d'AleIla. Alella. Publicacions de la Parròquia d'Alella. Pp. 14, 34 y 49.
- ARTÈS, S. (1963) Alella i Gaudí. Alella. 1ª época. Nº 35. Alella, XI.
- BASSEGODA NONELL, JOAN (1983) Cien años del retablo de Alella. La Vanguardia. Barcelona. 18–7–1983.
- (1985) EI campanil de Alella. La Vanguardia. Barcelona. 9–1–1985.
- (1989). El gran Gaudí. Sabadell. Ausa. ISBN 84-86329-44-2.
- CASANELLES, ENRIC (1965) El retaule d’Alella. Alella. III época. Nº 54. Alella. X. p. 4.
- (1965) Nueva Visión de Gaudí. Barcelona. Polígrafa.
- COLLINS. GEORGE R. (1960) Antonio Gaudí. New York. Braziller.
- MARTINELL, CÉSAR (1967) Gaudí. Su vida, su teoría, su obra. Barcelona. Colegio de Arquitectos de Cataluña y Baleares. P 47.
- RÀFOLS, JOSEP F. and FOLGUERA, FRANCISCO (1929) Gaudí. Barcelona. Canosa.
