= Cucuphas =

Spanish martyr

Saint Cucuphas
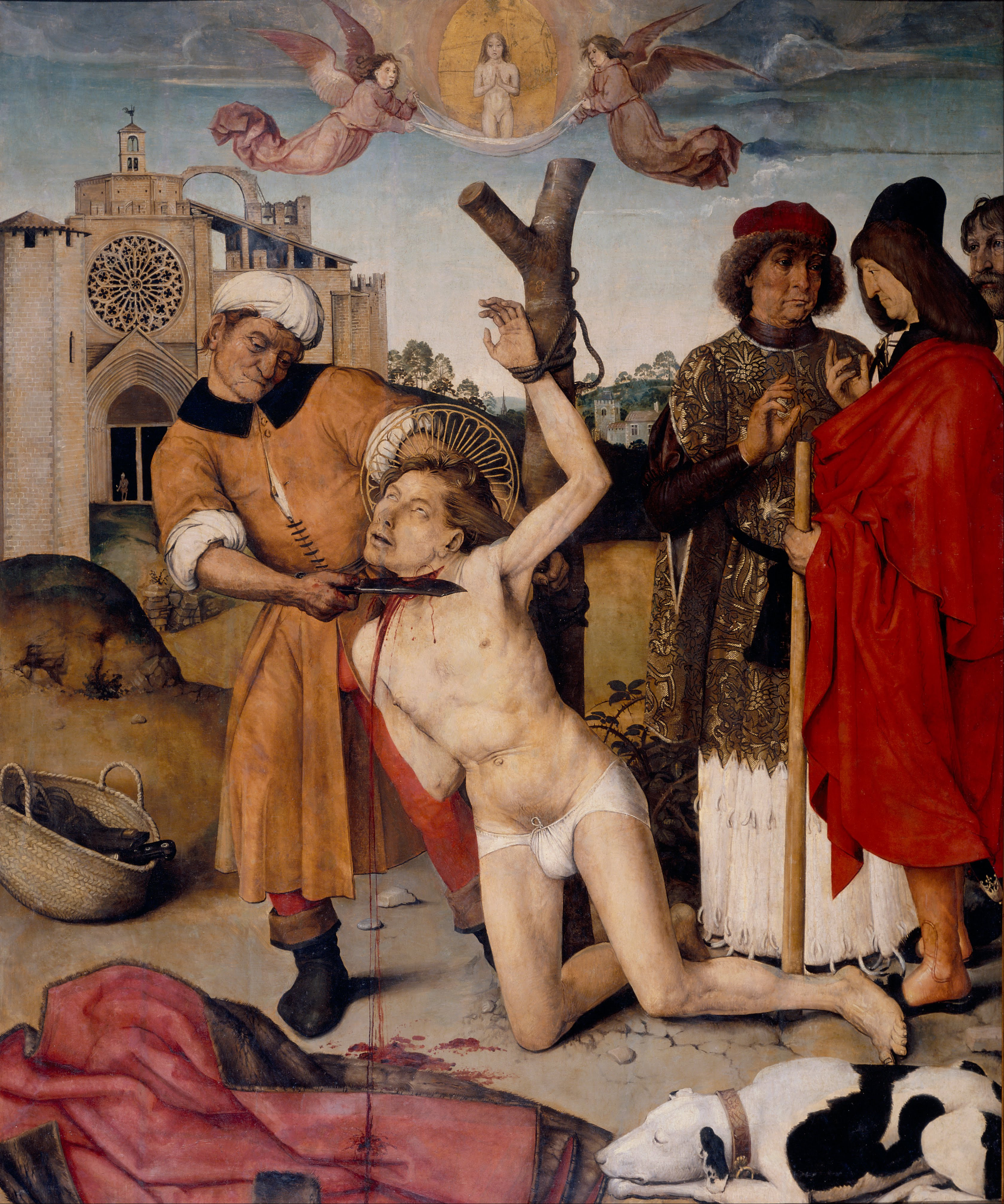
- The Martyrdom of Saint Cucuphas (Ayne Bru, 1504–1507)

Martyr
- Born: 269; Scillis
- Died: ~304 AD; Sant Cugat del Vallès
- Venerated in: Catholic Church, Eastern Orthodox Church
- Major shrine: Sant Cugat; Saint-Denis
- Feast: 25 July
- Attributes: Depicted being beheaded or having his throat cut
- Patronage: Hunchbacks; petty thieves

Saint Cucuphas (also Cucufas or Qaqophas, Catalan: Cugat, Culgat, Cougat, Spanish: Cucufate, Cucufato, Cocoba(s), French: Cucuphat, Cucufa, Cucuphat, Quiquenfat, Galician: Covade, Cobad, Occitan: Cophan, Asturian: Cucao) is a martyr of Spain. His feast day is 25 July but in some areas it is celebrated on 27 July to avoid conflict with the important feast day of Santiago, the patron saint of Spain. His name is said to be of Phoenician origin with the meaning of "he who jokes, he who likes to joke."

== Life ==
Cucuphas was born into a noble Christian family in Scillis (Africa Proconsularis). He and Saint Felix, later martyred at Girona, were said to have been deacons of the Catholic Church in Carthage who arrived at Barcelona to evangelize the area. According to his legend, he functioned as a merchant in Barcelona while preaching the Christian faith, baptizing converts, and aiding the Christian community there. According to Christian accounts of his life, he was generous with the poor and a worker of miracles.

He was martyred near Barcelona during the persecution of Diocletian. Under the Roman governor, he suffered many torments and was imprisoned somewhere near Barcelona, along the twenty-mile stretch between ancient Barcino (Barcelona) and Egara (Terrassa). His throat was finally cut in 304. Tradition holds that two Christian women from Illuro (Mataró), Juliana and Semproniana, buried his body and were consequently martyred as well.

The Benedictine abbey of Sant Cugat del Vallès is considered to be situated on the site of his martyrdom, which was once the Roman site of Castrum Octavianum.

Details of his martyrdom state that he was handed over to twelve strong soldiers, who were ordered to whip him and tear his skin with iron nails and scorpions. Cucuphas was then roasted alive after being covered in vinegar and pepper, though heavenly intervention saved him from death and injury. A great bonfire also failed to kill the saint and instead killed his would-be executioners. His jailers were then subsequently converted to Christianity after they found Cucuphas in his cell illuminated with heavenly light. The next day, he was flagellated with iron whips. By means of heavenly intervention, the prefect Maximianus was killed when his carriage caught on fire. Rufus, the new prefect, prudently decided not to practice torture of any kind on the saint and instead ordered his immediate execution by sword.

== Textual references ==
The poet Prudentius honored him in a hymn. Cucuphas is mentioned in the Hieronymian Martyrology; the Prayer Book of Verona (7th century AD); in a hymn called Barcino laeto Cucufate vernans (7th century, recorded in manuscripts in Toledo and Silos, 10th–11th centuries), which has been attributed to Quiricus of Barcelona; the Liber Sacramentorum (Toledo, 9th century, Mozarabic mass dedicated to Cucuphas); Martyrology of Ado; Martyrology of Usuard (9th century); and the Martyrology of Saint Peter of Cardeña (10th century, presumed copy of 7th-century manuscript).

The early medieval hymn Barcino laeto Cucufate vernans runs as follows:

Barchinon laeto Cucufate vernans,

corporis sancti tumulum honorans,

et locum sacri venerans sepulchri,

sparge ligustris.

("Barcino bursts into the vernal joy,

of Saint Cucuphas, honoring his remains,

and spreads privet branches on the burial

mound and on the tomb".)

== Relics ==
When the first Benedictine community gathered at Sant Cugat in the 9th century, the monastery dedicated itself to the pre-existing veneration of Cucuphas. Since the eighth century, Sant Cugat has claimed Cucuphas' relics. In the eighth century, Saint Fulrad took a relic of Cucuphas from Sant Cugat to Saint-Denis. The relics of Cucuphas occupy a place of honor in the apse to the right of Saint Denis to this day.

From the 14th century onwards, Sant Cugat kept the martyr's remains in a small chest, decorated with scenes of the saint's life. This chest was taken to the parish of Sant Cugat del Rec (or "del Forn") in Barcelona after the monasteries were freed from mortmain.

In 1950, Sant Cugat commemorated a relic proceeding from this chest of Sant Cugat del Rec. The relics are now in the crypt of the basilica of Santa Maria del Mar.

Many churches in Europe, from the Middle Ages onwards, claimed his relics, including Reichenau; the cathedrals of Braga, Oviedo; and Lièpvre, whose monastery had been founded by Fulrad, who had already brought some of the saint's relics to Saint-Denis.

The twelfth-century Historia Compostelana contains an account of the relics of Cucuphas being taken secretly from Braga to Santiago de Compostela by Diego Gelmírez, where they were placed in the cathedral.

== Veneration in France ==
The saint is venerated at Paris, with some of his relics enshrined at the church of Saint-Denis, in the Chapelle Saint-Cucuphas. Near Rueil-Malmaison, a forest is named Bois de St-Cucufa, and a tiny lake carries the saint's name. Property of the state since 1871, the forest was called Bois Béranger (Nemus/Boscus Berengerii) until the Benedictines built a chapel dedicated to the saint in the 13th century. Pilgrimages to the shrine of "Saint Quiquenfat" were practiced until the eighteenth century.

Other place-names that may point to Cucuphas' cult in France include Guinelat, Conat, and Coplian.

== Veneration in Spain ==
The diocese of Girona has several parochial churches dedicated to him.

San Cucao de Llanera is situated in the municipality of Llanera, Asturias.

Concern amongst Catalan devotees of the saint was raised when it was discovered in 2001 that the name of Saint Cucuphas had been removed from the latest version of the Roman Martyrology. However, the saint had been included – under his Latin (and English) name of "Cucuphas" rather than "Cugat". In the martyrology, he was described as a "martyr of the persecution of Diocletian, killed with a sword. Fourth century. African."

Saints Juliana and Semproniana are still venerated at Mataró on 27 July. They appear with Cucuphas in the façade of the church of Santa Maria de Mataró.

In the folklore and tradition people pray to this saint when they lose things and are not able to find their belongings again. Some knots are made in a handkerchief with a cord, an allegory that represents tying the testicles of the saint. Then a prayer is performed as follows:

"San Cucufato, San Cucufato las canicas te ato y hasta que no encuentres mi (objeto perdido) no te los desato".

Which means:

"Saint Cucuphas, Saint Cucuphas the marbles I tie, and until you find my (lost belonging) I will not untie them".

== Patronage ==
He is not generally associated with any special patronage, although Ángel Rodríguez Vilagrán writes that Joan Amades' Costumari Català mentions that anciently, hunchbacks venerated Cucuphas as their patron saint, as well as those who committed petty thefts. The origins of this patronage are not known.

== Gallery ==
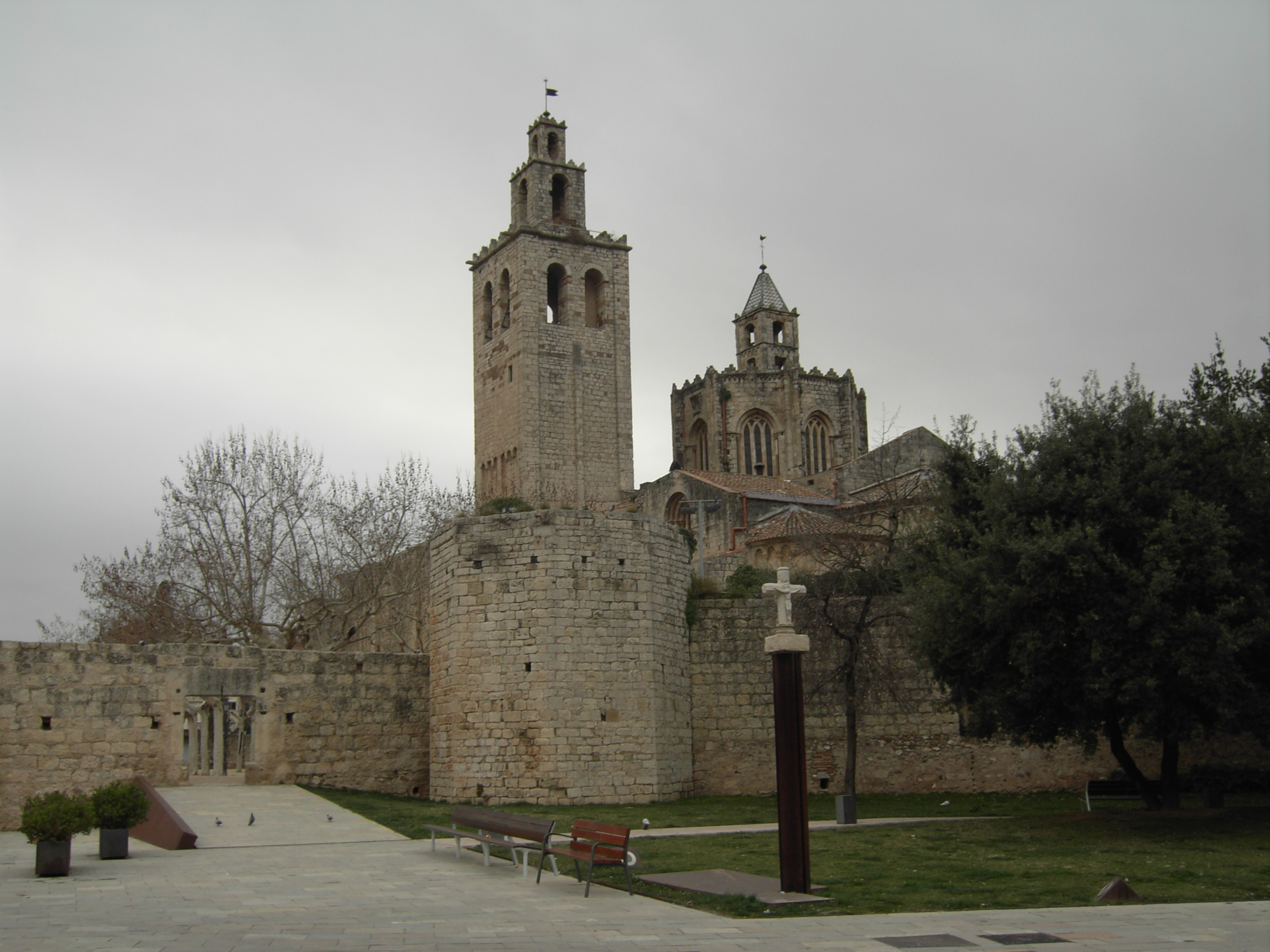
Sant Cugat monastery

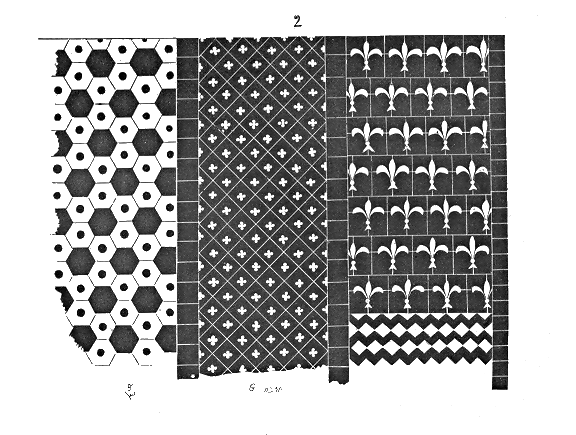
Ceramic tile designs from the Saint-Cucuphas Chapel, Saint-Denis

== See also ==
- Casket of Saint Cugat
