= Casket of Saint Cugat =

14th-century reliquary

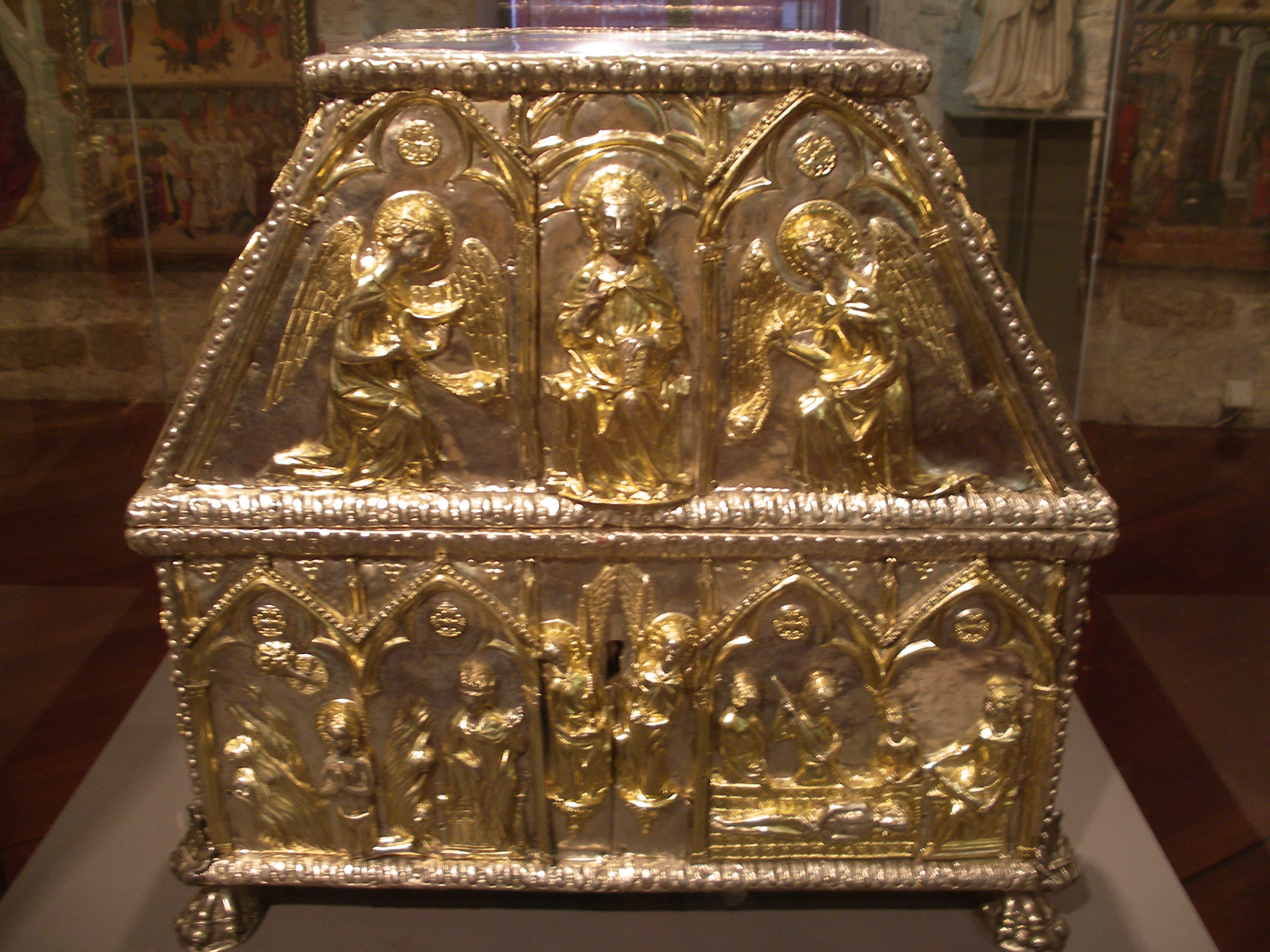
- The casket of Saint Cugat, by Joan de Gènova, and Arnau Campredon
- Material: Gold, silver
- Height: 63
- Width: 63
- Depth: 26
- Created: c. 1303
- Period/culture: gothic
- Present location: Museu Diocesà de Barcelona

The casket of Sant Cugat is a reliquary of gold from the beginning of the fourteenth century. It is made with embossed silver plates engraved and partly superimposed on a golden casket of wood, depicting scenes from the life and death of the martyr Saint Cugat. Its makers were Joan de Gènova and Arnau Campredon. During the seventeenth century, it was dismantled and built in a smaller size in which the plates were reused from the previous silver.

The casket was kept in the monastery of Sant Cugat del Vallès since the fourteenth century until 1835, when, due to the confiscation of the monastery, the casket with the relics were moved to the church Sant Cugat del Rec, Barcelona. It currently belongs to the collection of the Diocesan Museum of Barcelona.

== History ==
On 18 September 1303, the abbot of the monastery of Sant Cugat Burguet Pons (1298-1306) received a legacy of Bonanat Basset aimed at building a casket for storing relics of St. Cugat: "Caxiam [...] Argenta et bono servicium beati Sancti Cucuphatis martyrdom."

The task was entrusted to goldsmith Juan de Genova (Genoa Johannes), who was of Italian origin settled in Perpignan, at that time continental capital of the Kingdom of Mallorca. the document called the contract appears together with his collaborator sculptor Arnau Campredon. Also in the same document, it states that the two artists traveling to Barcelona would be in charge of principals, the monastery of Sant Cugat.

The casket was dismantled between 1664 and 1665, for an unknown reason, and there was a smaller casket with 120 cm width 63 cm, although the silver plates were reused from the old casket.

In 1835, the ecclesiastical confiscation and closure of the monastery, the casket still in Sant Cugat was moved to the parish church of Sant Cugat del Rec in Barcelona. In 1916, Jerome Martorell, member of the Board of Museums of Barcelona, pointed out in a note that, in his opinion, the municipal art museum collections could be completed with several works, that could be potential acquisitions, among them was the casket of St. Cuga.

== Theme ==
The theme is depicted the life of St. Cugat from his arrival in Barcino, his preaching and conversions to his arrest and death by beheading by order of Maximian, the emperor of Rome, and his burial by the Juliana and Semproniana disciples, all narrated serially around the casket, designed to hold its relics. The theme of the martyrdom of St. Cugat has been treated later in other works of art, as the table massacre of Sant Cugat (1504-1507) of Ayne Bru, from the old altarpiece of the monastery of Sant Cugat and is the National Art Museum of Catalonia and the four paintings are in the basilica of Santa Maria de Mataro, where this saint is depicted along with his disciples and Juliana Semproniana; the titles of these works are: Preaching Sant Cugat (1796) Judgment of the Saints (1797), the Martyrdom of the Saints (1799) and the Martyrdom of St. Cugat. The latter was replaced, since 1945, the original title of the same name that was burned in 1936 during the Spanish Civil War. With the same theme box burned remains a painting, believed sketch, in El Masnou Municipal Nautical Museum, titled the slaughter of Sant Cugat by Pere Pau Montaña i Placeta.

It is said that St. Cugat landed in Barcelona from the town of Scilla (modern Tunisia) to North Africa from Carthage. Along with Saint Feliu, he arrived in Barcelona at the end of the third century, where he was dedicated to preach the gospel. In 303, Emperor Diocletian had given the order for the extermination of Christians in what would be the last of the great persecution against Christianity in the Roman Empire. He was taken prisoner by Maximus, and after suffering various tortures, was beheaded in 304 on the site called Castrum Octavianum. He was buried in a Christian graveyard, the same place where he was executed, Juliana and Semproniana had previously been baptized; who were then also martyred for having attended the ceremony of Christian burial of Sant Cugat. In the place, they built the monastery of Sant Cugat.

== Construction ==
The white and silver gilt that was used to replace the Gothic gold jewelry, which prevailed in the past, although it continued to be used for the realization of special pieces, usually commissioned by kings and the worship of great cathedrals. The predominance the silver was due to the cheapness of the material compared to gold, and also for their physical and chemical properties, to facilitate its alloy with copper and to facilitate their development, giving a material hardness. There were parts made from a single piece by casting, and others formed by different plates welded on wood nailed together or via tabs. A silver plate was given the shape of the inlay, based on blows with the hammer to achieve planned shape; and plates reinforced the edge moldings which in turn served as ornamentation. The chiseled and embossed finishing of the piece were striking foil for the front or the back.

During the Gothic, there were many relics, to guard and venerate remains of saints and martyrs. The most normal of caskets was shaped tomb, mostly rectangular and covered with two or four sides, made of wood and plated with silver plates. This is the same type of boxes (c. 1315), (1413-1453), the St. Lawrence (1240-1350) and the chest of San Cugat. A fairly common technique also, was to cover the body of the casket in plaster reliefs gilded with gold, as in the Urn St. Candide (1292), preserved the National Art Museum of Catalonia. Most ark reliquaries were shaped as elements of a union of architectural forms with arches, windows, crenellations and pinnacles.

== See also ==
- ca:Arqueta de Sant Patllari
- ca:Arqueta de Sant Martirià
