= Church of St. Felix, Girona =

Spanish church

Coordinates: 41.9836°N 2.8167°E

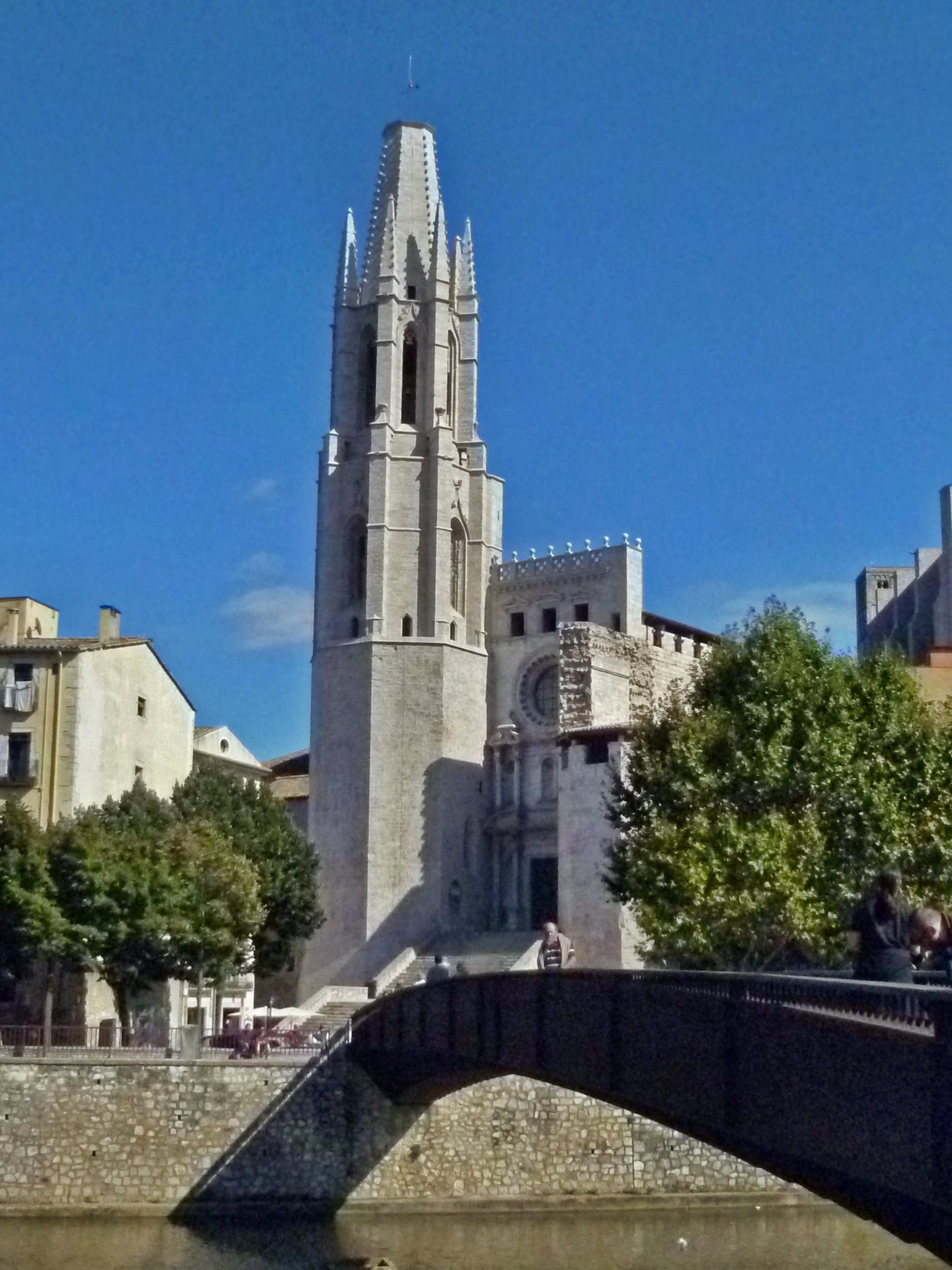
The Collegiate Church of Sant Felix, as seen from the river Onyar.

The Collegiate Church of St. Felix (Catalan: Col·legiata de Sant Feliu) is a basilica dedicated to St. Felix in the Catalan city of Girona, dating to the early days of Christianity. It houses the offices of the Parish of Sant Feliu, the Roman Catholic Diocese of Girona, so called because it was the main church of Girona before the construction of the Girona Cathedral. Its construction, in honor of Felix of Girona (Sant Feliu), occurred from the 12th century until the 17th century. It retains much of the Romanesque construction, completed later with a Gothic nave and a covered baroque facade. It is notable for its eight Roman and early Christian sarcophagi of the 3rd and 4th centuries, along with the Gothic tomb of Narcissus of Girona who, according to tradition, was one of the early bishops of the see.
