= Sant Feliu Pedestrian Bridge =

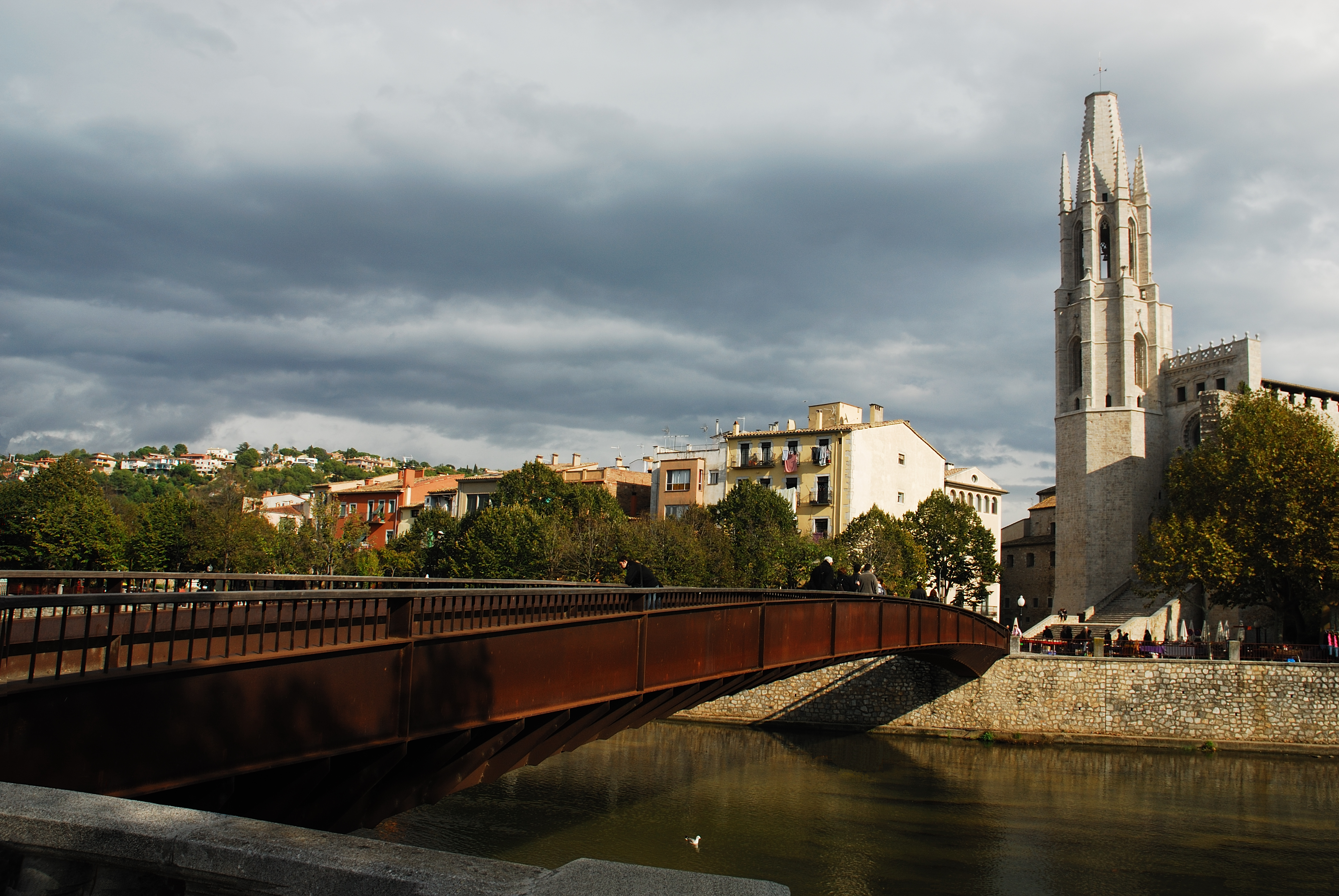
- Bridge view
- Coordinates: 41.988083°N 2.823500°E
- Crosses: Onyar River
- Locale: Girona, Catalonia, Spain

Characteristics
- Material: Weathering steel

History
- Designer: Pedelta Structural Engineers
- Opened: 1995

Location
- Interactive map of Sant Feliu Pedestrian Bridge

The Sant Feliu Pedestrian Bridge is a pedestrian bridge over the Onyar River in Girona, Catalonia, Spain. Built in 1998, the bridge connects Devesa Park with Saint Feliu Square. The structure is located in an urban surrounding, the old district of the city, with a strong personality. As a result, PEDELTA have designed a slender pedestrian structure; a pure minimalist solution. The bridge main span is 58.4 m. The structural system is a weathering steel frame with only one span, embedded on both ends into the concrete abutments.

== Description ==
The bridge comprises a 3.5 m wide deck and it is characterized for being a weathering steel box girder of variable height between 0.6 m (L/97) at middle span and 1.7 m (L/34) at supports. The steel hand rail has been conceived to be part of the main structure.

Civil engineering mention award (2º Prize) in Construmat Exhibition for the Sant Feliu footbridge design in Girona (2000). This bridge was also selected for the FAD Awards (1997) and Eduardo Torroja Awards (1999).

== Construction ==
The steel girder was prefabricated in three segments. The three pieces were lifted to their final position, using two auxiliary supports, and finally welded together. Thereafter, the two concrete abutments were cast in place to complete the final structure.
