= Alella =

- Municipality
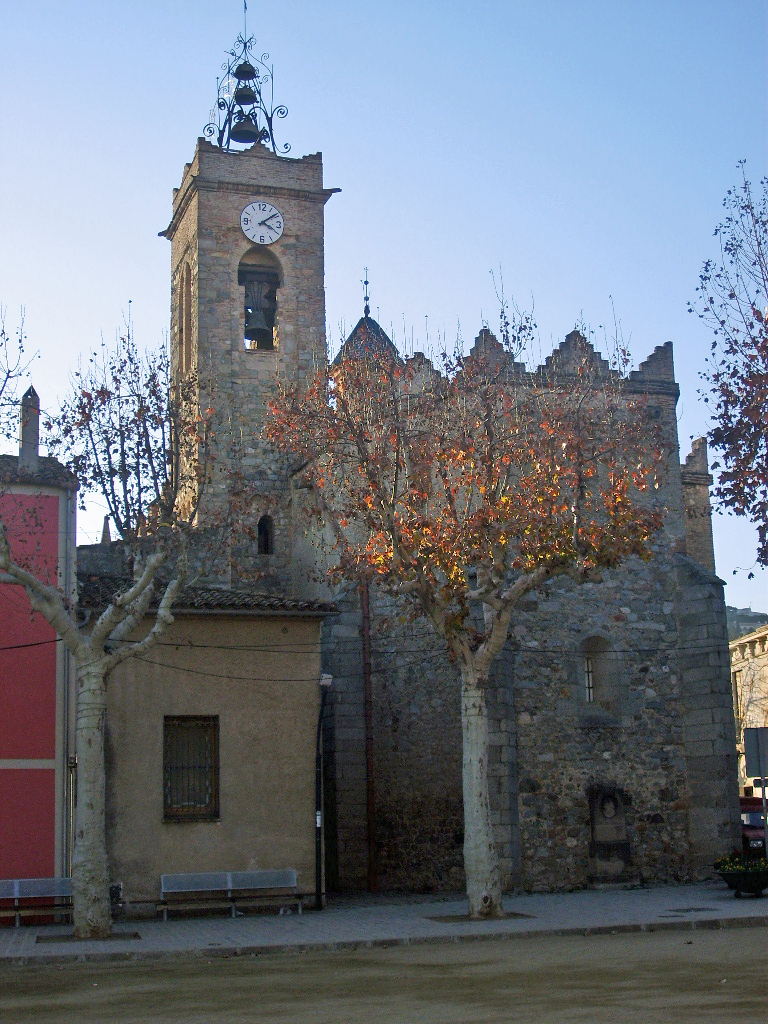
- Sant Feliu Church

- Coat of arms

- Location in Catalonia Alella (Spain)
- Coordinates: 41.495°N 2.296°E
- Country: Spain
- Community: Catalonia
- Province: Barcelona
- Comarca: Maresme

Government
  - Mayor: Marc Almendro Campillo

Area
  - Total: 9.676 km^{2} (3.736 sq mi)
- Elevation: 90 m (300 ft)

Population (November 1, 2011)
  - Total: 9,582
  - Density: 990.3/km^{2} (2,565/sq mi)
- Demonyms: Alellenc, alellenca
- Postal code: 08328
- Area code: 080039
- Website: alella.cat

Alella (Catalan pronunciation: [əˈleʎə]) is a village in the comarca of Maresme in Catalonia, Spain. It is situated on the coast on the southwest side of the granite Catalan Coastal Range. Located nearby Barcelona and known for its wines, cava and perfumes, it is the wealthiest municipality in Catalonia.

What used to be the old Via Augusta, connecting Rome and Andalusia, is still today a narrow road running through the village.

== Demography ==
According to Spanish census data, this is the population of Alella in recent years.

1981	1991	2001	2011
3,381	6,895	8,470	9,582

== Historical and interesting buildings ==
- Church of Sant Feliu, Roman construction which has inside the Altarpiece designed by Catalan architect Antoni Gaudí.
- "Cal Marqués", a civil building of neoclassical construction.
- "Casa Alella" or "Les Quatre Torres", a civil eclectic building.
- "Masía Can Magarola" is one of the oldest farmhouses in Alella and it preserves remains of buildings from the late 13th and early 14th centuries.

== Notable natives ==
- Francesc Ferrer i Guàrdia often simply known as Francisco Ferrer, a free-thinker and anarchist.
- Marc Cucurella, footballer for Real Madrid.
