= San Cucao =

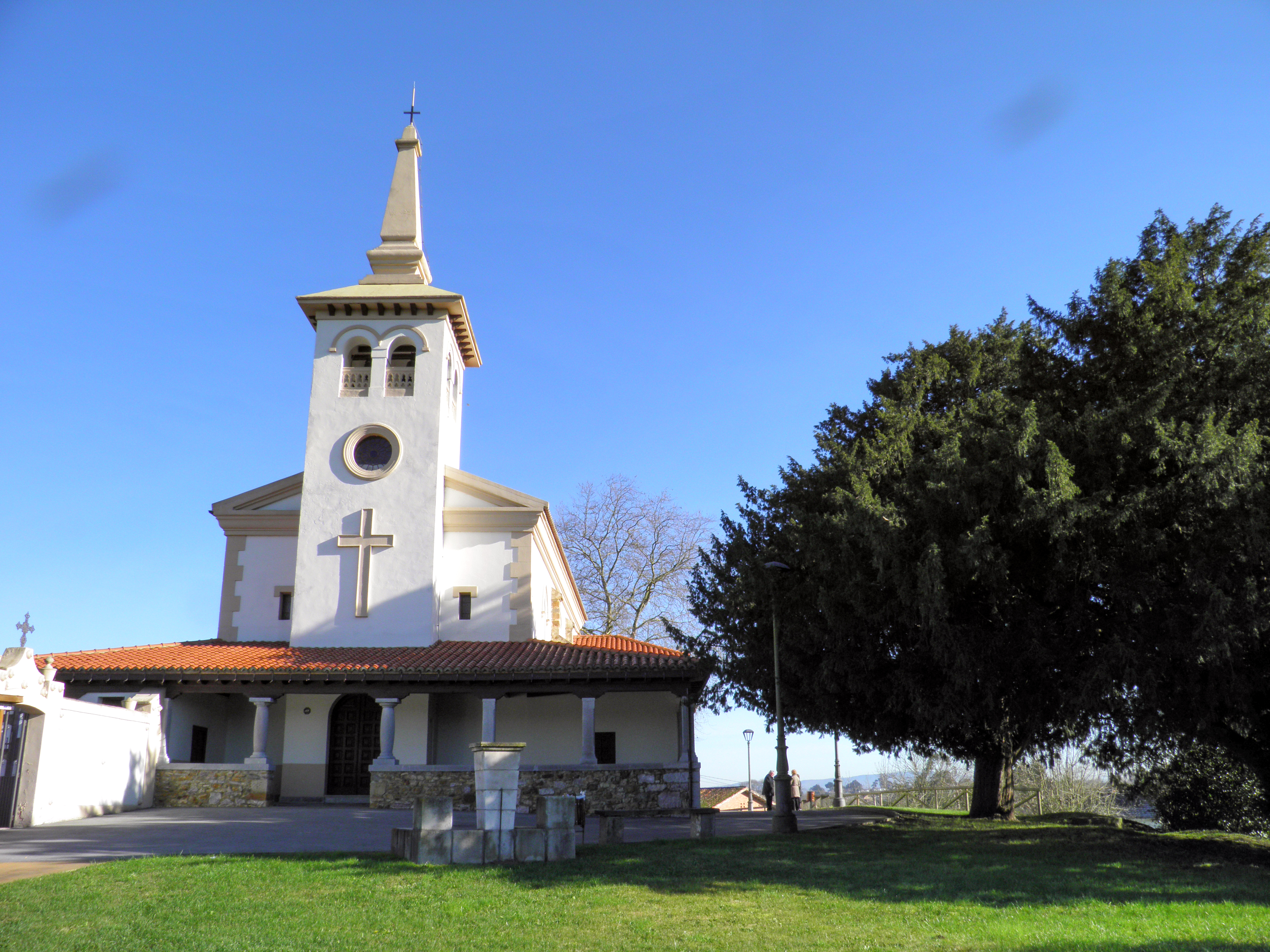
San Cucao Church

San Cucao (Spanish: San Cucufate de Llanera) is a parish of the municipality of Llanera, Asturias. Its name refers to Saint Cucuphas.

== Sources ==
- Rodríguez Álvarez, Ramón (May 2008). Real Instituto de Estudios Asturianos, ed. Llanera. Asturias concejo a concejo 13. Oviedo ISBN 9788487212635
- Memoria Cultural y Natural del Concejo de Llanera, pdf. 2008
