= Scillium =

Ancient Roman city in present-day Kasserine Governorate, Tunisia

- Location within Tunisia
- 35.166667°N 8.833333°E
- Location: Tunisia
- Region: Kasserine Governorate

Scillium is an ancient city in the Roman province of Africa Proconsularis, Scillium must not be confounded with Silli, or Sililli, in Numidia, the situation of which is unknown nor, as Albert Battandier does, identified with Kasrin, which is Cillium, a see of Byzantium. Its episcopal see was a suffragan of the see of Carthage, capital of the province.

== History ==
On 17 July, 180, six martyrs (Scillitan Martyrs) suffered for the Faith at Scillium; later, a basilica in which St. Augustine preached was dedicated to them (near Douar esh-Shott, west of the town). The Greek version of their Acts, in an addition which is later, says they were natives of "Ischle, Ischle, in Numidia". This name is a Greek transcription of Scillium. The tradition is already recorded in the primitive calendar of Carthage. The Greek compiler intended possibly to speak not of the province of Numidia, but of the Numidian country and so would have placed Scillium in Proconsular Numidia. An epitaph of Simitthu, now Chemtou, mentions Iscilitana; Simitthu was certainly in Proconsular Numidia, it is unclear if Scillium was near it.

Two of its bishops are mentioned: Squillacius, present at the Conference of Carthage in 411; and Pariator, who signed the letter addressed in 646 by the council of the proconsulate to the Patriarch Paul of Constantinople against the monothelites.

The town is mentioned in the seventh century by Georgius Cyprius under the name of Schele.

Scillium was the native place of St. Cucuphas, martyred at Barcelona, and of St. Felix, martyred at Girona.

== Note ==
The above is taken from the entry "Scillium" by Sophrone Pétridès in the Catholic Encyclopedia of 1912. Scilium is the spelling that appears in the 2013 edition of the Annuario Pontificio and some other recent sources. Other sources also report the Scilitan or Scillitan Martyrs not as six but as twelve and as having been tried and executed in Carthage.
