= Llanera, Asturias =

Llanera
- Municipality
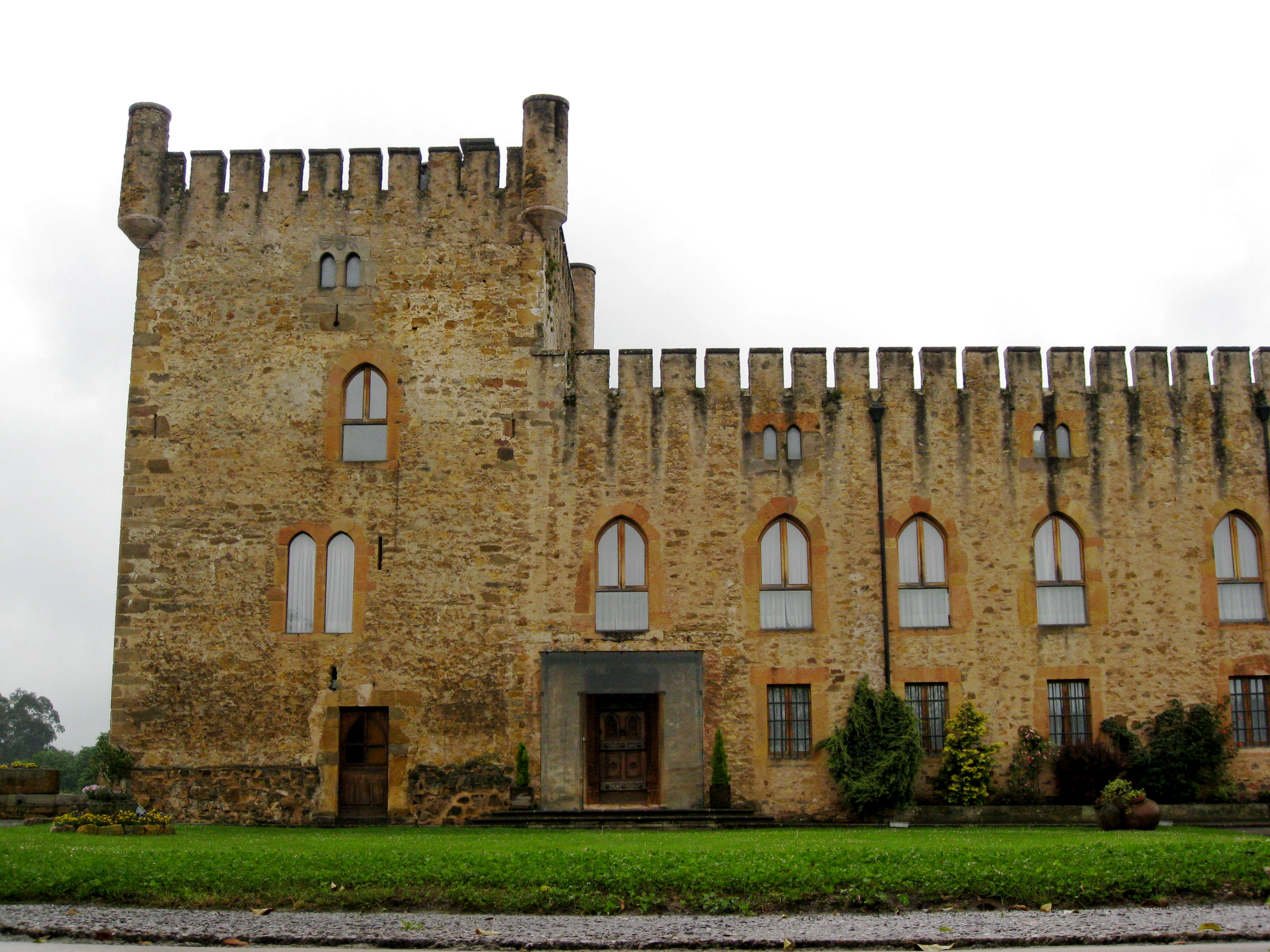
- Palaciu de Villanueva en San Cucao, council of Llanera, Asturias, Spain.

- Coat of arms

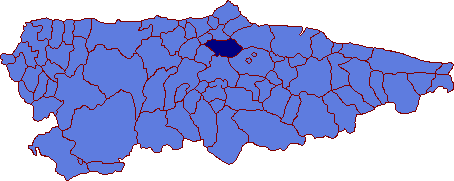

- Location in Spain
- Coordinates: 43°28′N 5°56′W
- Country: Spain
- Autonomous community: Asturias
- Province: Asturias
- Comarca: Oviedo
- Judicial district: Oviedo
- Capital: Posada de Llanera

Government
  - Alcalde: Gerardo Sanz Pérez (PSOE)

Area
  - Total: 106.69 km^{2} (41.19 sq mi)
- Highest elevation: 317 m (1,040 ft)

Population (2025-01-01)
  - Total: 14,020
  - Density: 131.4/km^{2} (340.3/sq mi)
- Demonym: llanerense
- Time zone: UTC+1 (CET)
  - Summer (DST): UTC+2 (CEST)
- Postal code: 33424
- Official language(s): Asturian, Spanish

Llanera is a municipality in the Autonomous Community of the Principality of Asturias, Spain. It is bordered on the north by Gijón and Corvera de Asturias, on the south by Oviedo, on the east by Gijón and Siero, and on the west by Illas and Las Regueras. Its capital is located 11 km from Oviedo, 20 km from Avilés, and 22 km from Gijón.

Renfe, the national railroad organization, has stations in Lugo de Llanera, Villabona y Ferroñes.

The municipality has an important industrial sector. There are industrial parks at Silvota and Asipo.

There is a penitentiary in Villabona.

Lugo de Llanera was founded as a Roman settlement, named Lucus Asturum. It is situated at the fork of the Roman roads to Astorga and Cantabria.

== Parishes ==
- Ables
- Arlós
- Bonielles
- Cayés
- Ferroñes
- Lugo de Llanera
- Pruvia
- Rondiella
- San Cucufate de Llanera
- Santa Cruz de Llanera
- Villardeveyo

== Notable people ==
- Francisco Álvarez Martínez (1925–2022), cardinal of the Catholic Church
- Santiago Cazorla

== See also ==
- List of municipalities in Asturias
