= Saint Candidus =

Egyptian saint

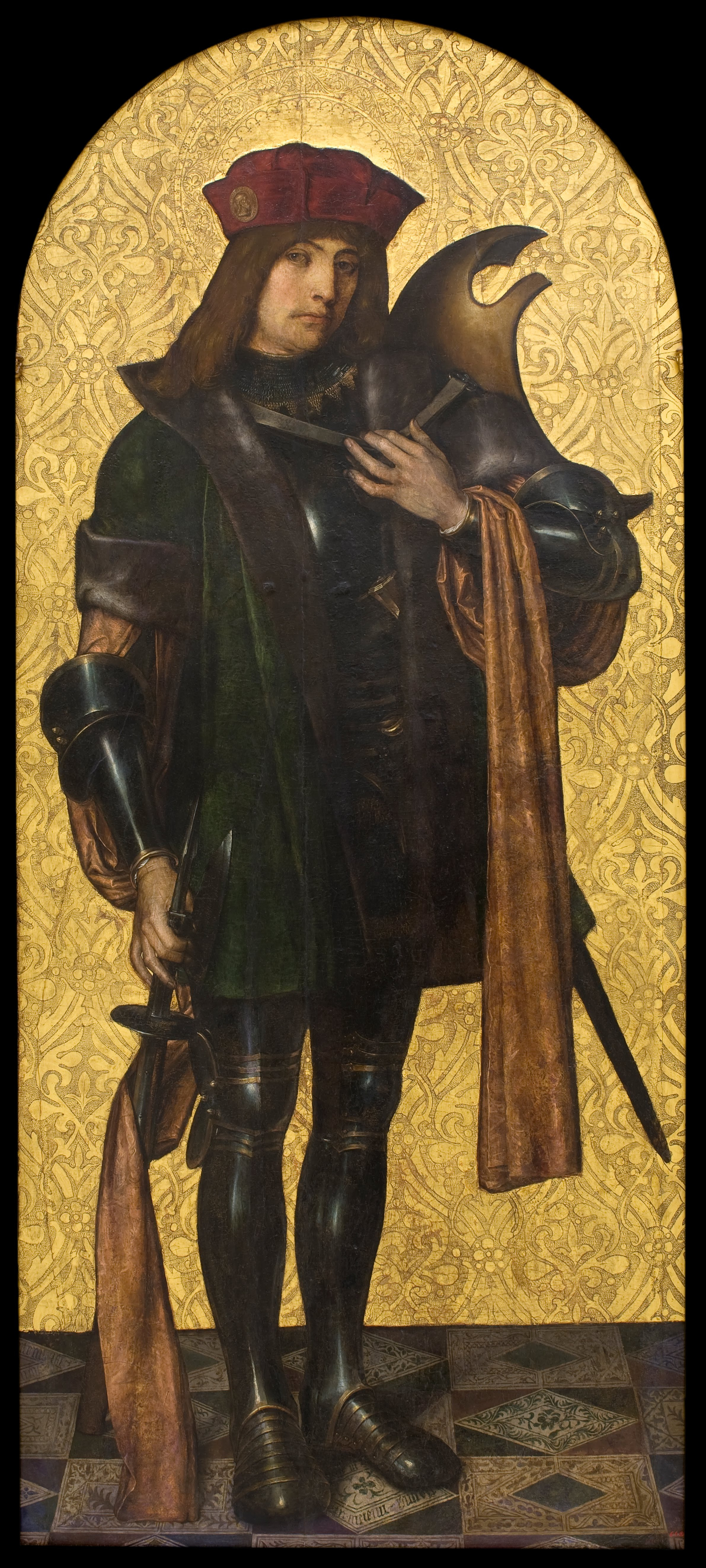
- Saint Candidus, by Ayne Bru, 16th century, preserved at Museu Nacional d'Art de Catalunya, in Barcelona
- Born: 3rd century Thebes, Egypt
- Died: c. 287 AD; Saint Maurice-en-Valais
- Venerated in: Roman Catholic Church, Coptic Orthodox Church, Orthodox Catholic Church
- Major shrine: Abbaye de Saint-Maurice d'Agaune
- Feast: September 22
- Attributes: Military attire

Candidus (died c. 287 AD) was a commander of the Theban Legion. The Theban Legion was composed of Christians from Upper Egypt. He is venerated as a Christian saint and martyr.

== Legend ==
Candidus was first mentioned as a member of the Theban Legion by Eucherius, Bishop of Lyon (434 AD). The 13th-century Golden Legend states: "And the noble man, Maurice, was duke of this holy legion; and they that governed under him, which bare the banners, were named Saint Candidus, Saint Innocent, Saint Exsuperius, Saint Victor, and Saint Constantine, all these were captains."

Candidus is called Maurice's senator militum or staff officer. He opposed Maximian, who had ordered them to harass the local Christians in his name, stating that "we are your soldiers, but we are also servants of the true God. We cannot renounce Him who is our Creator and Master, and also yours even though you reject Him."

Candidus, along with Maurice, the other staff officers and 6,600 soldiers, is said to have been martyred at the Swiss town of Saint Maurice-en-Valais, then called Agaunum. His feast day is September 22.

== Remains ==
Candidus' relics were stored in a 6th-century reliquary at the Abbaye de Saint-Maurice d'Agaune. His skull is kept in an embossed silver bust in the Abbey's Treasury. Some of Candidus' relics are stored at Our Lady of Malibu Catholic Church, given by the Archdiocese of Los Angeles to the newly formed parish in 1960 under founding rector, Joseph Burbage. The relics were rededicated by Archbishop Jose Gomez in November, 2014. It has been confirmed that his relics can also be found at St. Bonaventure Catholic Church in Huntington Beach, CA.

== Other saints with this name ==
- Candidus of Armenia, Armenian martyr venerated on 10 March.
- Candidus of Rome, a Roman martyr buried on the Esquiline Hill, whose feast day is October 3.
- Candidus the Martyr, Martyr whose feast day is February 2.
- Candidus of Maastricht, 4th or 5th-century Bishop of Maastricht, successor of Saint Servatius, although he may not have been officially bishop. His relics were translated in 1039. His feast day is 7 June, the same as Saint Valentinus of Tongeren. In the Art & History Museum in Brussels is a 12th-century gable reliquary, which originally was exhibited with the Shrine of Saint Servatius in the Collegiate Church of St Servatius in Maastricht. The church still owns a stone sarcophagus that once contained Candidus's relics (amongst others), and two 19th-century copies of the Brussels gable reliquary.

== Gallery ==
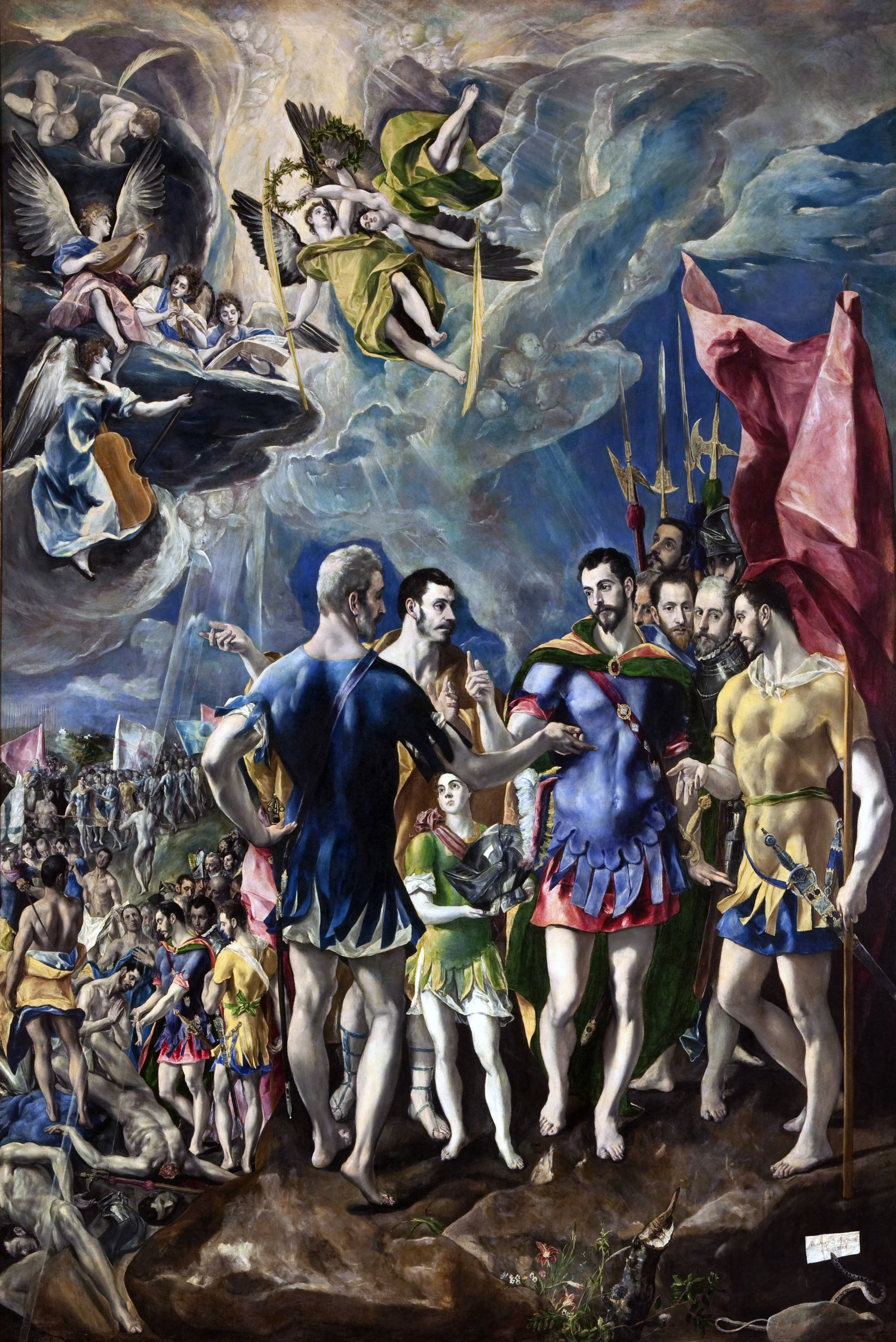
El Greco's The Martyrdom of St. Maurice. The figure to Saint Maurice's right has been identified as Saint Candidus.

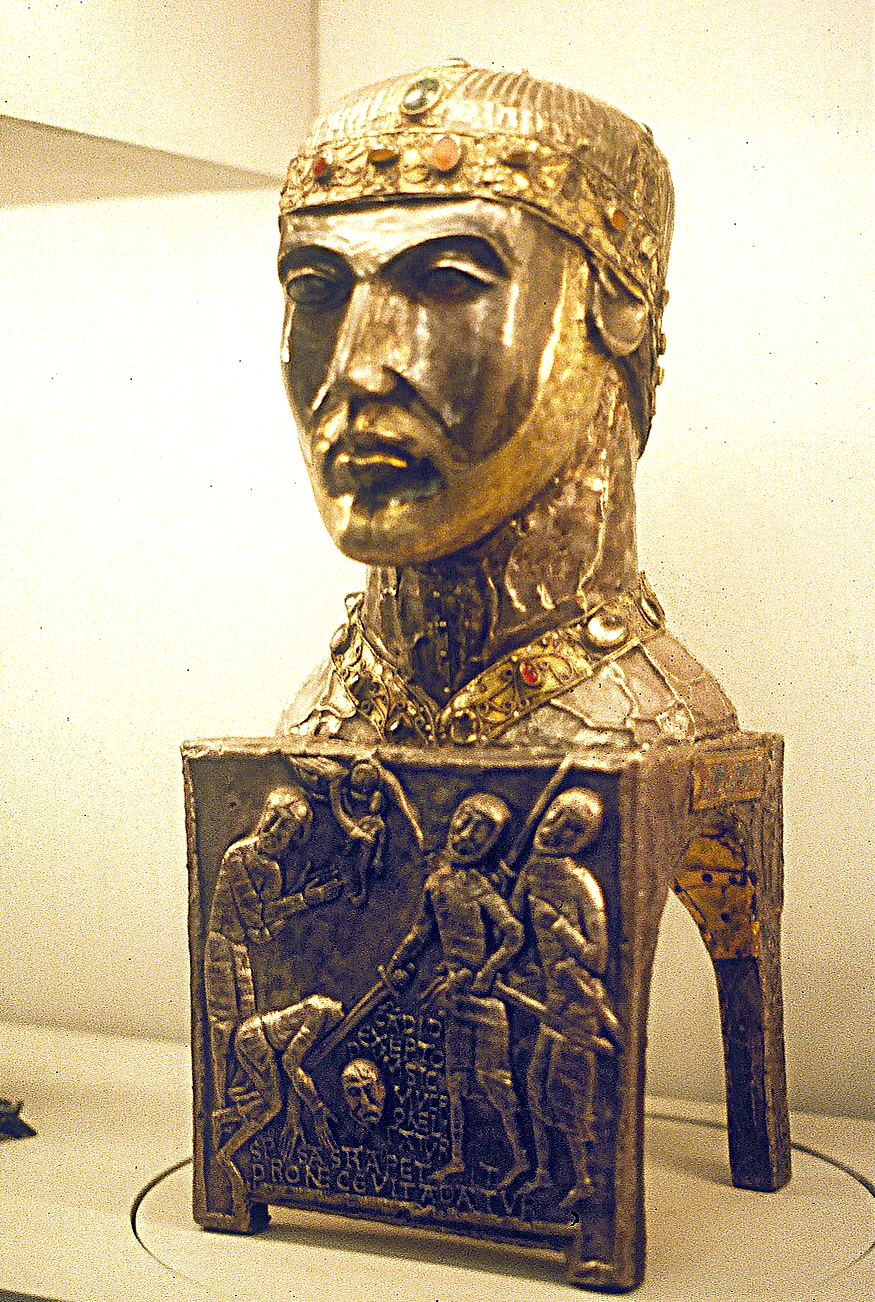
Candidus bust in Saint-Maurice

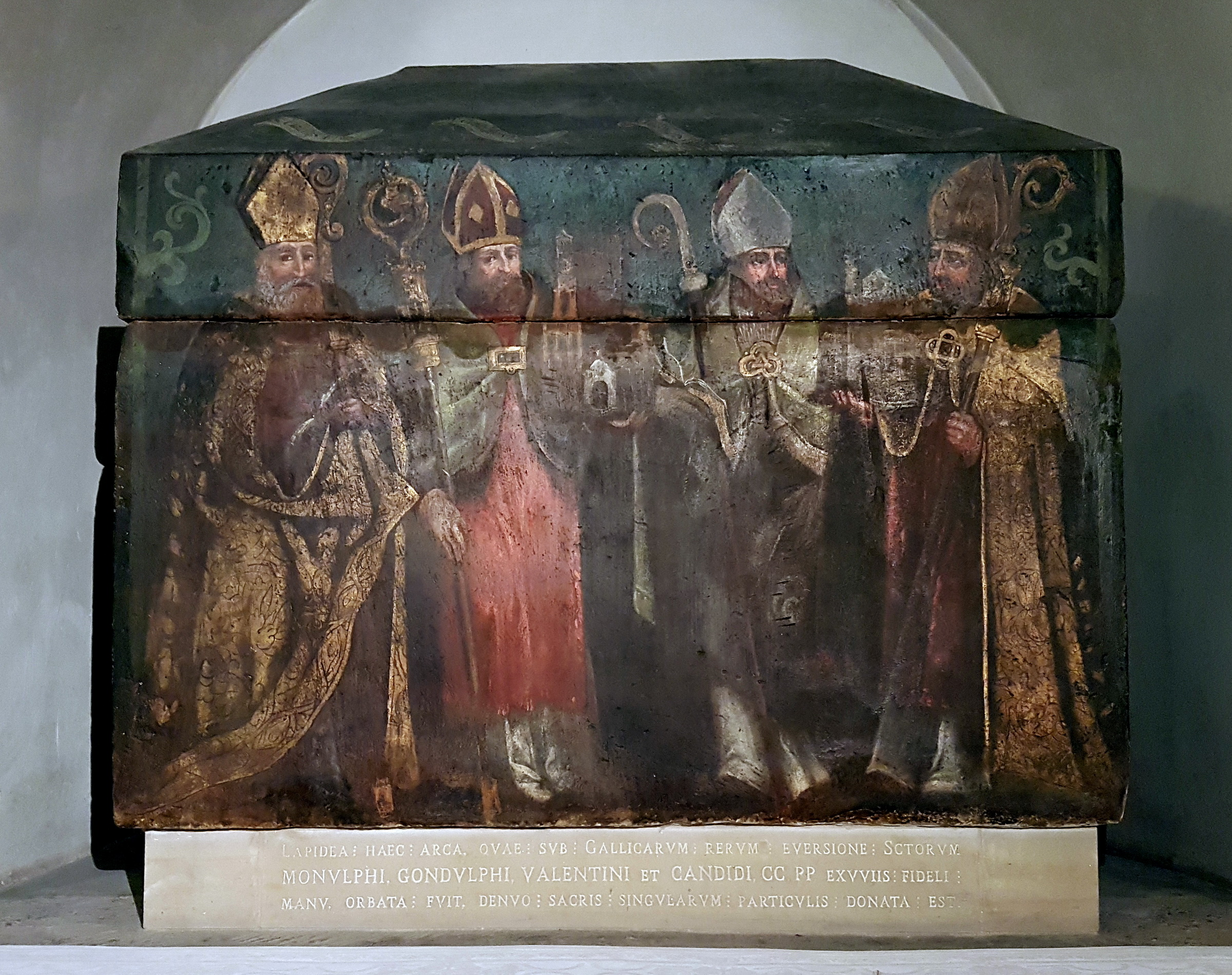
Candidus of Maastricht, sarcophagus in Maastricht

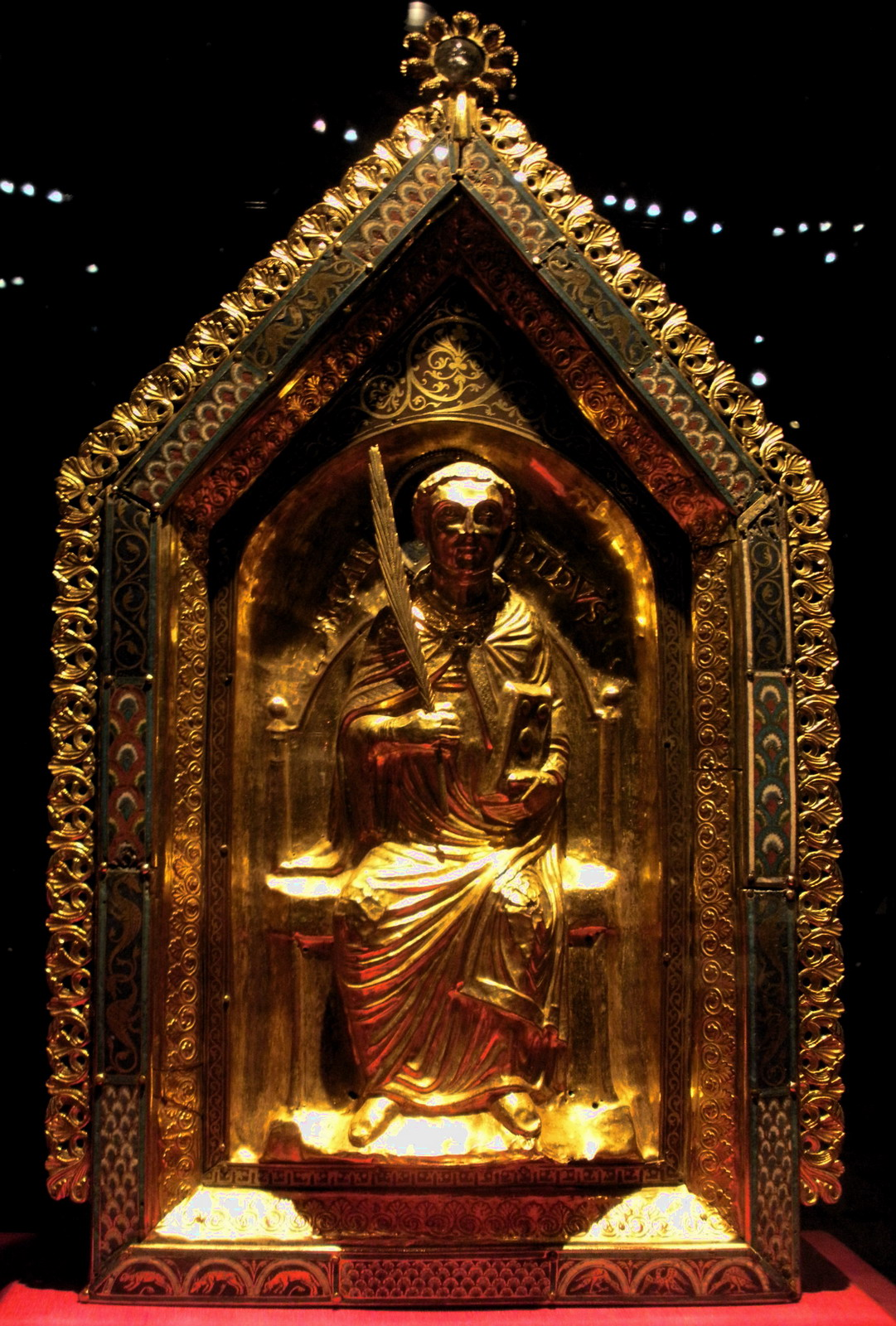
Candidus of Maastricht, reliquary in Brussels
