= Onyar =

River in Catalonia, Spain

Coordinates: 41°58′14″N 2°50′22″E

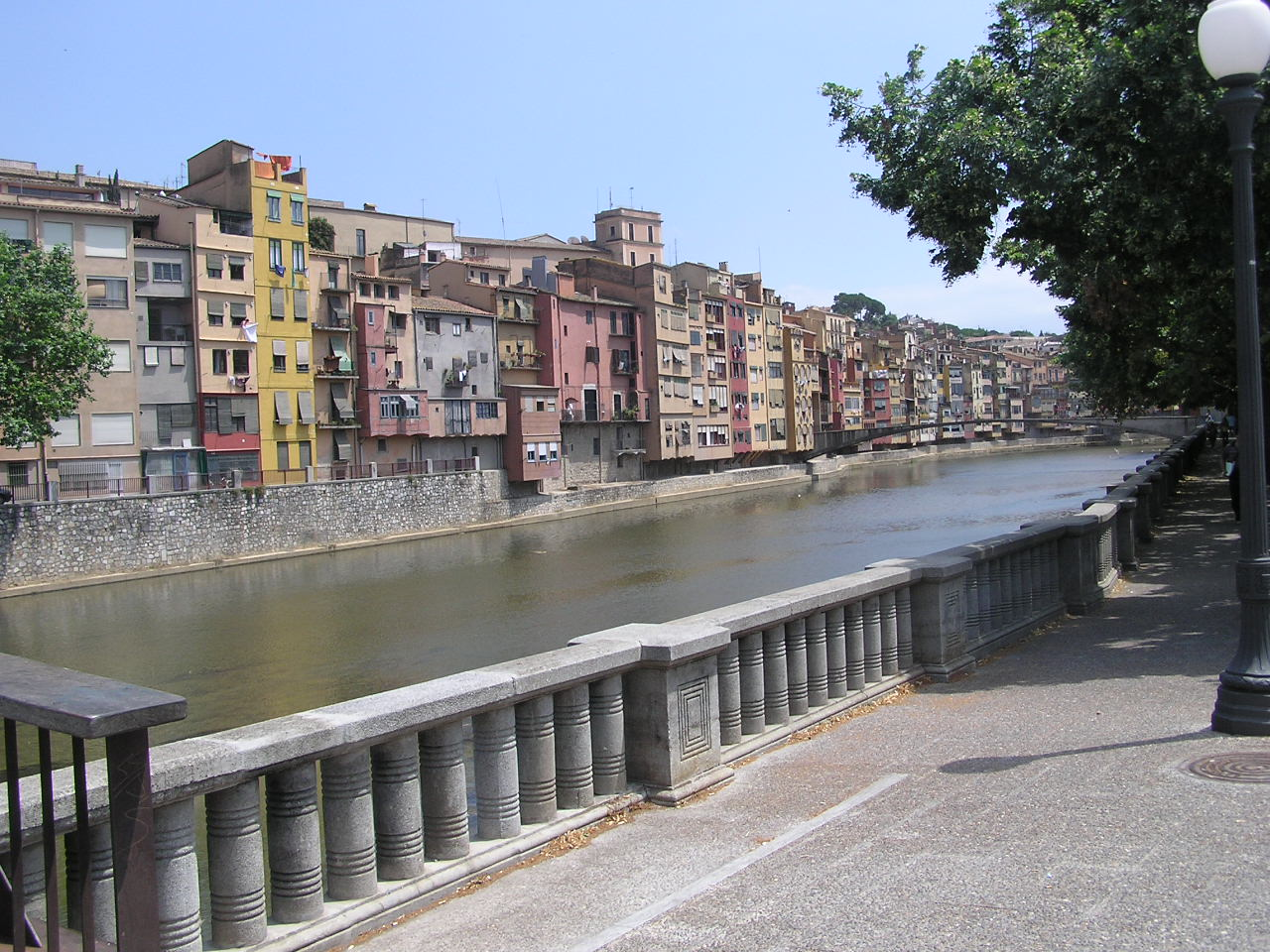
"Cases del Onyar", next to the Onyar River in Girona

The Onyar (Catalan: [uˈɲa]; Spanish: Oñar [oˈɲaɾ]; Undarius in Latin) is a Spanish river in Girona, Catalonia, that begins at the Guilleries massif at the apex of the Catalan Transversal Range and the Pre-Coastal Range. It joins the Ter at the city of Girona, and crosses the city from south to north, separating the city into the old part (on the right side) and the more modern part (on the left side).

During its course through the city, the Onyar river is joined by the waters coming from the Monar or Conda irrigation channel (which in turn comes from the Ter river), a channel that used to irrigate the orchards in the "Mercadal" area. As it journeys further north, the river converges with the Güell and the Galligans rivers near the crossing with the railway. Finally, it merges into the Ter river near the Pedret neighborhood.

The river Onyar

Over the years, the Onyar and Güell rivers have been associated with notable flood events that have had a profound impact on the city. The period spanning from 1970 to 1985 was particularly devastating, resulting in significant material losses. These floods are documented to have affected over 75% of the city, causing disruption to approximately 2000 commercial and industrial establishments, as well as damaging or destroying 500 vehicles

The river flows alongside a charming tourist destination known as the Onyar's houses ("Casas del Onyar" in Catalan), comprising a vibrant ensemble of homes that have become iconic subjects for postcards and tourist literature

== Tributaries ==
- Riera Gotarra
- Bogantó

== See also ==
- Sant Feliu Pedestrian Bridge
