= Ayne Bru =

Spanish painter

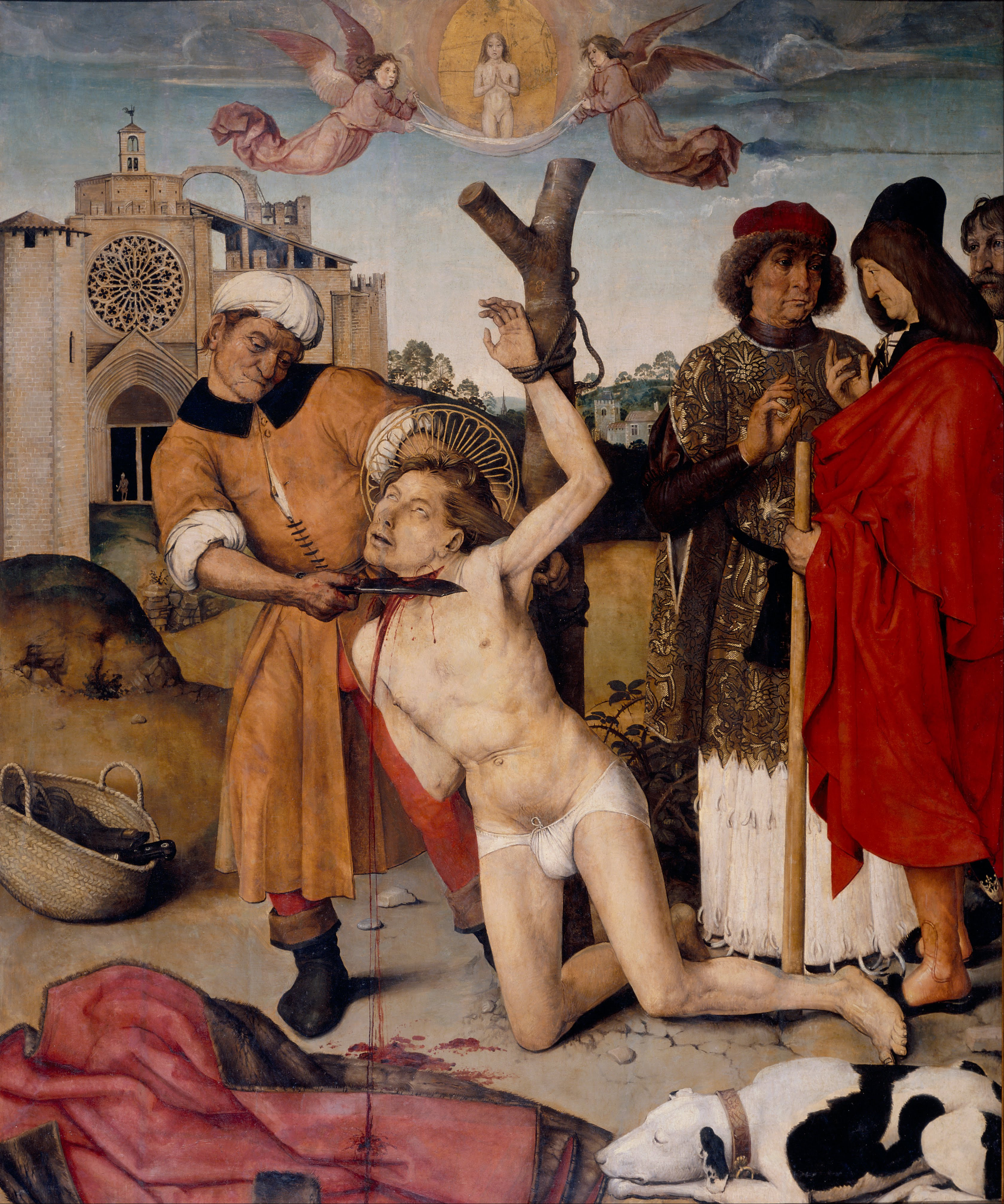
The Martyrdom of Saint Cucuphas, 1504–7, Ayne Bru

Ayne (Aine) Bru (probably a Catalanization of Hans Brün) was a 16th-century Renaissance painter of German origin who worked in Catalonia. He may have proceeded from Lummen, in the Duchy of Brabant. He is sometimes also called Lucius de Brun. His surname may also suggest provenance from the town of Brünn.

In 1502, he was hired to paint the main altar (retablo) in the church of the monastery of Sant Cugat del Vallès, for which he was paid a staggering wage between 1504 and 1507.

On the central panel, Bru depicted the martyrdom of Saint Cucuphas (in Catalan, Sant Cugat) with enormous realism. The executioner cuts the saint's throat while Cucuphas remains tied to a tree trunk. Nearby, there appear another knife (in a basket) and a dog sleeping peacefully. This work is now at the National Art Museum of Catalonia (Museu Nacional d'Art de Catalunya).

The dog from Bru's painting of Cucuphas' martyrdom was later borrowed by Salvador Dalí for a painting called Dalí Contemplating Nude or Dalí Dalí Dalí.

The vast countryside that serves as a background anachronistically includes the actual monastery of Sant Cugat. Another panel, depicting Saint George (sometimes identified as Saint Candidus or simply as "Warrior Saint"), was attached to this one. It has been rejoined and is visible at the National Art Museum of Catalonia.

Marcel Durliat believes that though the expressionism in this painting is evidence of a Germanic artistic tradition, Bru's Quattrocento depiction of the standing figures in contemporary dress, as well as other details, indicate that the painter may have lived or studied in Northern Italy before moving to Barcelona.

== Gallery ==
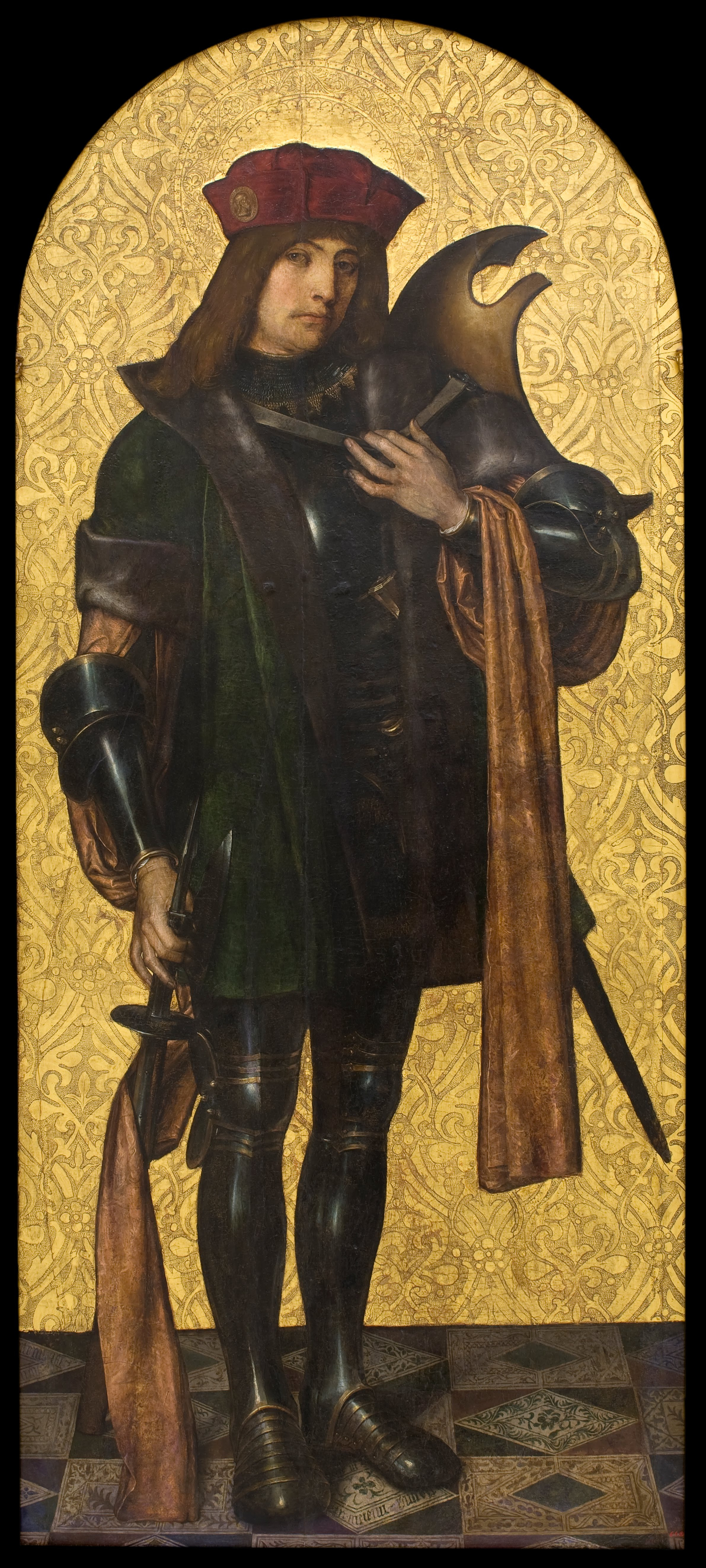
Saint Candidus
