= Felix of Girona =

- Born: Scillium, Africa (Roman province) proconsularis, today's Tunisia
- Died: 31 August 304 AD; Girona, Spain
- Venerated in: Roman Catholic Church, Eastern Orthodox Church
- Feast: 1 August

Saint Felix of Girona (Catalan: Sant Feliu) (died 304) is a Catalan saint. He was martyred at Girona after traveling from Carthage with Saint Cucuphas to Spain as a missionary.

Felix was born in Scillium. His feast day is celebrated on 1 August.

There is a basilica dedicated to St. Felix in the Catalan city of Girona, dating to the early days of Christianity called Church of St. Felix, Girona or Basilica of Sant Feliu.
