= Portuguese language =

Romance language

Portuguese
- português
- Pronunciation: [puɾtuˈɡeʃ] (European Portuguese pron.) [poʁtuˈɡe(j)s] (Brazilian Portuguese pron.)
- Native to: Portugal, Brazil, Lusophone Africa, other locations in the Portuguese-speaking world
- Speakers: L1: 250 million (2012–2022); L2: 17 million (2022); Total: 267 million (2012–2022)
- Language family: Indo-European: Italic; Latino-Faliscan; Latin; Romance; Italo-Western; Western Romance; Gallo-Iberian; Iberian Romance; West Iberian; Galician–Portuguese; Portuguese
- Early forms: Old Latin: Vulgar Latin; Proto-Romance; Galician–Portuguese
- Writing system: Latin (Portuguese alphabet); Portuguese Braille
- Signed forms: Manually coded Portuguese

Official status
- Official language in: Angola; Brazil; Cape Verde; Timor-Leste; Equatorial Guinea; Guinea-Bissau; Macau (China) Mozambique; Portugal; São Tomé and Príncipe; Numerous international organizations
- Regulated by: Portugal: Lisbon Academy of Sciences (Lisbon Academy Class of Letters); Brazil: Brazilian Academy of Letters; Angola: Angolan Academy of Letters

Language codes
- ISO 639-1: pt
- ISO 639-2: por
- ISO 639-3: por
- Glottolog: port1283
- Linguasphere: 51-AAA-a
- Countries or regions where Portuguese is the native language of the majority Countries and territories where Portuguese is an official or administrative language but not a majority native language Countries and territories where Portuguese is a significant minority language

Portuguese (endonym: português) is a Western Romance language from the Indo-European language family. With approximately 267 million native speakers, it is the fifth-most spoken native language in the world, and the most widely spoken language in the Southern Hemisphere. It is the official language of eight countries — Portugal, Brazil, Angola, Mozambique, Cape Verde, Guinea-Bissau, São Tomé and Príncipe, and Timor-Leste — and is co-official with other languages in Macau and Equatorial Guinea.

Portuguese-speaking people or nations are known as Lusophone (lusófono). As a result of expansion during colonial times, a cultural presence of Portuguese speakers is also found around the world. Portuguese is part of the Ibero-Romance group, which evolved from several dialects of Vulgar Latin in the medieval Kingdom of Galicia and the County of Portugal, and has retained some Celtic phonology.

Portuguese language structure reflects both its Latin roots and centuries of outside influences. These are seen in phonology, orthography, grammar, and vocabulary. Phonologically, Portuguese has a rich system of nasal vowels, complex consonant variations, and different types of guttural R – as well as other sounds in its European and Brazilian varieties. Its spelling, based similarly to English on the Latin alphabet, is largely phonemic but is influenced by etymology and tradition. Recent spelling reforms have attempted to create a unified spelling for the Portuguese language across all countries that use it. Portuguese grammar retains many Latin verb forms, and possesses several unique features (such as the future subjunctive and the personal infinitive). Its vocabulary is derived largely from Latin, but also includes numerous loanwords from Celtic, Germanic, Arabic, African, Amerindian, and Asian languages, resulting from historical contact based on wars, trade, and colonization.

There is significant variation in the dialects of Portuguese worldwide, with two primary standardized varieties: European Portuguese and Brazilian Portuguese, each one having numerous regional accents and subdialects. African and Asian varieties generally follow the European written standard, though these will often display different phonological, lexical, and sometimes even syntactic features. While there is broad mutual intelligibility among the assorted lusophone population, variation may be observed in speech patterns, vocabulary, or grammar.

== History ==
=== Origins and Roman period ===
Prior to Roman expansion, the territory corresponding to modern Portugal was inhabited by a heterogeneous set of peoples, including the Gallaeci, Lusitanians, Celts, Iberians, Phoenicians, Greeks, and Ligurians. These groups spoke a variety of languages that were gradually supplanted following Roman conquest, but not without leaving a substratum of lexical and morphological influence. A significant number of Portuguese words — often associated with the natural environment, agriculture, and material culture — are attributed to these pre-Roman sources.

The Roman presence in the Iberian Peninsula began in 218 BC during the Second Punic War, initially as part of military operations against Carthage. Roman control expanded progressively, with the defeat of Carthaginian forces completed by 209 BC, although full territorial consolidation was not achieved until 19 BC under the rule of Augustus, following campaigns in the northern regions of Asturias and Cantabria. During this period, the territory was administratively organized into provinces such as Hispania Citerior and Hispania Ulterior, later restructured into Tarraconensis, Baetica, and Lusitania. By the late Roman Empire, the northwestern region was designated as the province of Gallaecia (approximately modern-day Galicia).

Latin served as the administrative and ecclesiastical language of the Roman Empire, and proficiency in it was associated with access to public office and social advancement. The degree of Romanization varied regionally: southern areas, particularly Baetica, underwent rapid cultural assimilation and early adoption of Latin, whereas the northern regions, including Gallaecia, remained comparatively isolated and retained indigenous practices for a longer period. Latin spread from urban centers outward through cities, educational institutions and administrative networks, where proficiency in Latin was closely tied to the acquisition of Roman citizenship; the variety spoken by soldiers, settlers and officials was known as Vulgar Latin (sermo vulgaris), as distinct from Classical Latin, which was used in literary texts.

In the northwestern periphery of the empire, the Vulgar Latin spoken in Gallaecia developed distinctive features, attributed in part to reduced contact with the imperial center. The most diagnostic phonetic change was the loss of intervocalic l and n, as in luna to lua ('moon'), dolor to dor ('pain'), and moneta to moeda ('coin') — a development not attested in neighbouring varieties such as Spanish. Geminate consonants were also simplified, as in caballu to cavalo ('horse') and annu to ano ('year'), and initial consonant clusters cl-, fl-, and pl- evolved into palatal sounds, as in flamma to chama ('flame'), pluvia to chuva ('rain'), and plumbum to chumbo ('lead').

In 409, the Iberian Peninsula was invaded by several Germanic and Iranian peoples, including the Vandals, Suebi, and Alans. The Visigoths of the Visigothic Kingdom, already established in Aquitaine and closely connected to Roman institutions, extended their rule over most of the peninsula during the 5th and 6th centuries. Their integration with the Hispano-Roman population was facilitated by measures such as the legalization of intermarriage under Leovigild, the conversion of Reccared I to Catholic Christianity in 586, and the promulgation of a unified legal code in 654 under Recceswinth. These developments contributed to the consolidation of a Romano-Visigothic society in which the vernacular remained a form of Hispano-Romance derived from Vulgar Latin. The Visigothic linguistic contribution to Portuguese was limited, consisting of fewer than forty commonly cited lexical items of Gothic origin, many shared with other Romance languages. Examples include guerra ('war'), espora ('spur'), roupa ('clothing'), and ganso ('goose').

=== Arab conquest and old Galician–Portuguese ===
Map showing the linguistic evolution of the Iberian Peninsula between 1000 and 2000. The Galician–Portuguese language is shown in blue.

In 711, Muslim forces crossed the Strait of Gibraltar and defeated the Visigothic king Roderic, leading to the Islamic rule of the Iberian Peninsula. The Muslim authorities generally allowed the continued use of local Romance varieties, the preservation of Hispano-Roman customs. In the Muslim-controlled south, Christians living under Moorish rule, known as Mozarabs, maintained their Latin-derived speech, referred to as Andalusi Romance. In the northern Christian kingdoms, different Romance varieties gradually emerged, including Galician–Portuguese in the region of Gallaecia, Asturleonese in the Kingdom of León, Spanish in Castile, Navarro-Aragonese in Navarre and Aragon and Catalan in Catalonia.

The northwestern region, corresponding to Gallaecia, also remained outside sustained Islamic rule. As a result, its local Romance variety Galician–Portuguese developed with greater continuity from Latin. The variety, which was spoken north and south of the Minho River, constituted a unified linguistic system from the 9th to the 14th century. Although Latin remained the language of administration and written literature for centuries, the emerging Romance varieties continued to develop in speech, and extensive texts in the vernacular only began to appear later. When the Kingdom of Portugal became independent in 1143, its inhabitants continued to use this shared variety, which remained the common vernacular of the region.

Between the 12th and 14th centuries, Galician–Portuguese served as the literary language of lyric poetry across the Iberian Peninsula, drawing on the troubadour tradition of southern France. The poetry of the period is preserved primarily in three major songbooks. The Cancioneiro da Ajuda, dated to the late 13th century, is the oldest and contains predominantly cantigas de amor. The Cancioneiro da Vaticana and the Cancioneiro da Biblioteca Nacional are 15th-century copies of earlier manuscripts containing secular and satirical compositions. The Cantiga da Ribeirinha (c. 1189 or 1198), composed by Paio Soares de Taveirós and preserved in the Cancioneiro da Ajuda, is regarded as one of the earliest known pieces of medieval Galician–Portuguese lyric poetry.

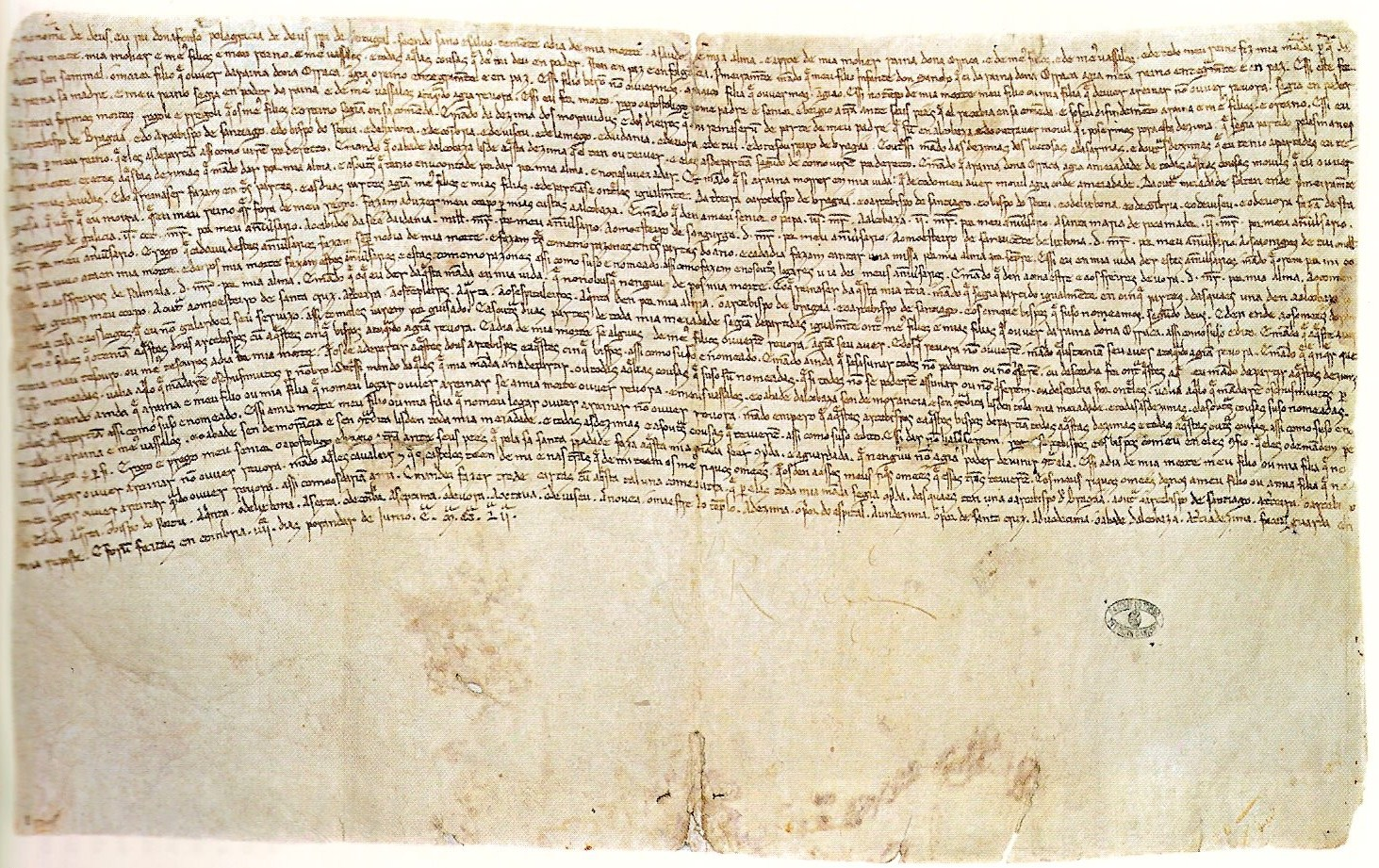
The Will of Afonso II preserved at the Torre do Tombo National Archives

The identification of the oldest document written in Old Portuguese is a matter of scholarly debate. Notícia de Fiadores (1175) has been identified by philologist Ana Maria Martins as the earliest surviving document written in Portuguese. However, she explicitly states that this chronology is not consensual and is the one she personally finds most accurate; other scholars argue that the presence of Romance elements in the text is limited and insufficient to classify it as a fully Galician-Portuguese document. The possibly earlier Pacto dos irmãos Pais has also been cited in this context. By contrast, the Will of Afonso II of Portugal (1214) is widely regarded as one of the earliest dated documents written entirely in Portuguese. It consists of three copies of the will of Afonso II (1211–1223), the third king of Portugal, drawn up during a period of ill health.

=== Divergence of Galician and Portuguese ===
The Galician and Portuguese language began to diverge from their common Galician–Portuguese base from around the 11th century. Early signs of separation are attested in Galician prose works, of which the Crónica Troiana is among the most frequently cited examples. By around 1250, Portuguese texts began to adopt digraphs such as lh and nh, replacing the Latin forms ll and nn. Between 1350 and 1450, Galicia experienced a second period of lyric production in which Portuguese poets did not participate.

In the late 13th century, King Denis of Portugal issued a decree establishing Portuguese as the mandatory language of royal administration, replacing Latin in the chancery. Documents including laws, forals, royal letters and court records were required to be written in Portuguese. Historian Cleusa Teixeira de Sousa has interpreted this measure as a strategy to strengthen the authority of the Portuguese crown. Following the rise of the House of Aviz after the Battle of Aljubarrota in 1385, the political center of Portugal shifted southward, to Lisbon and Coimbra. Northern Portugal subsequently came to be regarded as a peripheral region, while Galicia was increasingly treated as a foreign territory.

According to Rodolfo Ilari and Renato Basso, around 1420 marks the transition from Old Portuguese to Middle Portuguese, a periodization they attribute to scholars including Luís Lindley Cintra and Serafim da Silva Neto. Throughout much of the Middle Ages, the Portuguese language was commonly referred to as romance romanço or linguagem; by the 15th century, the designation "Portuguese language" became more widespread. The earliest known use of the term "Portuguese" (português) to designate the language dates to around 1430, appearing in a dedicatory letter written by Peter, Duke of Coimbra to his brother, King Duarte, accompanying his translation of Cicero's De Officiis, in which he writes explicitly: "eu lia em português" ('I was reading in Portuguese'). The printing press was introduced to Portugal in the late 15th century; Sacramental, a translation from Spanish into Portuguese, is among the earliest known printed works in the language, and contributed to the standardization of Portuguese orthography.

During the 16th and 17th centuries, Portuguese underwent a process of Latinate renewal, reincorporating Latin and Greek vocabulary. Much of this influence entered the language through Spanish. Some words that had lost intervocalic l and n through regular sound change were reintroduced in Latinate or Castilian forms, such as maíça > malícia ('malice'), saíva > saliva ('saliva') and paadar > paladar ('taste'). In orthography, this period saw the adoption of pseudo-etymological spellings imitating Latin and Greek forms, such as pharmacia, theatro, and rheumatismo.

The period also produced the first grammars of Portuguese. Fernão de Oliveira published the first in 1536, advocating an orthography based on pronunciation. He is considered one of the first grammaticians of the Portuguese language. João de Barros followed in 1540 with a grammar informed by humanist principles, at times justifying spellings on the basis of Latin etymologies. The influence of Renaissance humanism promoted an etymological orthography that brought written Portuguese closer to Latin. The publication of Luís de Camões's Os Lusíadas in 1572 is generally regarded by linguists as the start of Modern Portuguese. He is regarded as Portugal's national poet. Duarte Nunes de Leão extended the grammatical tradition with his Orthographia (1576) and Origem da Língua Portuguesa (1606), the latter among the earliest works to document dialectal variation in Portuguese.

=== Overseas expansion and the development of Portuguese in Brazil ===
Portuguese expansion beyond the Iberian Peninsula began in the 15th century, following the conquest of Ceuta in 1415. Portuguese contact with sub-Saharan Africa proceeded in stages along the Atlantic and Indian Ocean coasts. Settlement and exploration extended to Madeira and the Azores (1425–1439), followed by Cape Verde (1444), Guinea (1446), Angola (1483), and São Tomé and Príncipe (1485). The Portuguese navigator Vasco da Gama reached Mozambique in 1498, though the consolidation of Portuguese there was gradual and shaped by prolonged contact with Bantu languages. Between the 16th and 18th centuries, Portuguese functioned as a lingua franca in major ports across India and Southeast Asia. Portuguese established a network of commercial and administrative bases at Goa (1510), Malacca (1511), Hormuz (1515), Macau (1557), and Timor.

Following the Treaty of Tordesillas, the territory now known as Brazil was claimed for the Portuguese Empire on 22 April 1500 with the arrival of the Portuguese fleet commanded by Pedro Álvares Cabral. At the time of Portuguese arrival, the region was inhabited by Indigenous peoples who spoke more than 1,175 languages, with the Tupi–Guarani languages predominating along the coast. Portuguese therefore did not become the majority language immediately. From 1549, Jesuit missionaries systematized several indigenous languages into grammars, among them Joseph of Anchieta's grammar of Old Tupi (1595). The transatlantic slave trade brought speakers of an estimated 200 to 300 African languages to Brazil, primarily from West African and Bantu-speaking regions. Enslaved Africans were prohibited from using their native languages, and adopted Portuguese under conditions of irregular transmission.

The discovery of gold in Minas Gerais in the 1690s prompted large-scale internal migration and a wave of immigration from Portugal, strengthening the presence of Portuguese in the centre-south of the colony. In 1757, the Marquis of Pombal issued the Diretório dos Índios, prohibiting use of the widely used indigenous lingua francas and imposing Portuguese as the sole official language of administration and education. The transfer of the Portuguese royal court to Rio de Janeiro in 1808 reinforced the status of European Portuguese in the capital and introduced the printing press to Brazil. Following independence in 1822, a desire for a "Brazilian language" arose among intellectuals. Romantic writers such as José de Alencar advocated incorporating indigenous and popular terms into written Brazilian Portuguese, while purist grammarians insisted on adherence to European norms. From the mid-19th century onward, mass immigration of Italians, Germans, and Japanese, among others, introduced further lexical and phonetic influences, concentrated primarily in the South and Southeast regions.

Portuguese sovereign presence in Asia has since been largely withdrawn: the territories of Goa, Daman, and Diu were incorporated into the Indian Union in 1961, East Timor was annexed by Indonesia in 1975, gaining independence in 2002, and Macau was transferred to Chinese administration in 1999. In African countries where Portuguese is an official language, it also serves as a lingua franca among speakers of diverse native languages, particularly those belonging to the Bantu language family. Local varieties of Portuguese in Africa developed under sustained contact with indigenous languages, contributing to processes of lexical, phonological, and syntactic variation. On 17 July 1996, the Portuguese-speaking countries established the Community of Portuguese Language Countries (CPLP) to promote political, cultural, and linguistic cooperation among Lusophone states.

== Geographic distribution ==
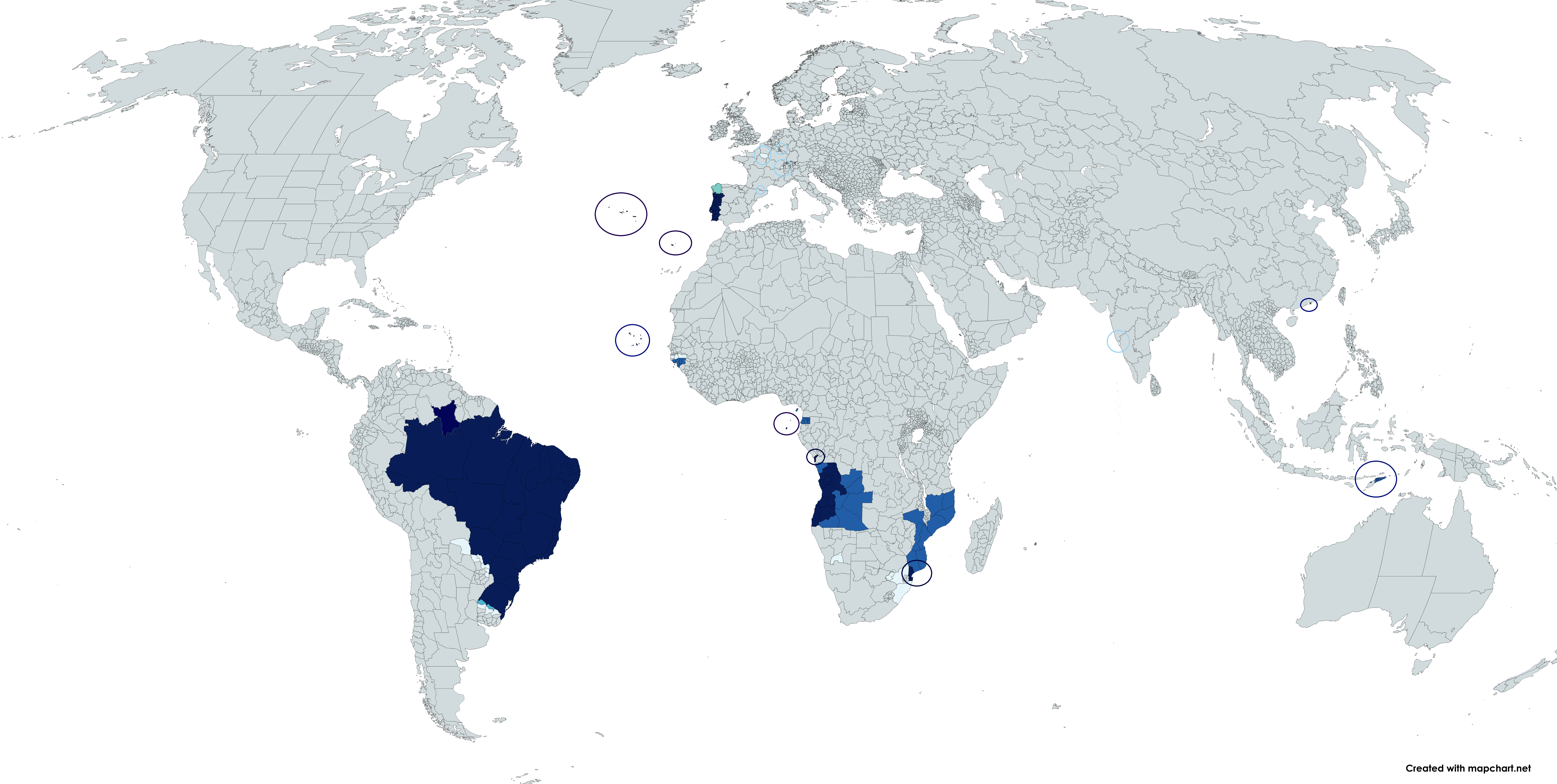
Portuguese Language Map – World Geographical Distribution Native/Mother language of the majority of the population – > 50% Official and administrative language, but minority native language – < 50% Cultural or secondary language - not official but spoken as a secondary native language - uruguayan portuguese - bayano, fronteiriço or riverense Cultural or secondary language - not official but spoken as a minority native or second language Galician is an official language – seen by some organizations as the same language as Portuguese

Portuguese – Native Language Gradient Native speakers: 90–100% Native speakers: 40–70% Native speakers: 10–20% Native speakers: 1–5% Native speakers: Less Than 1%

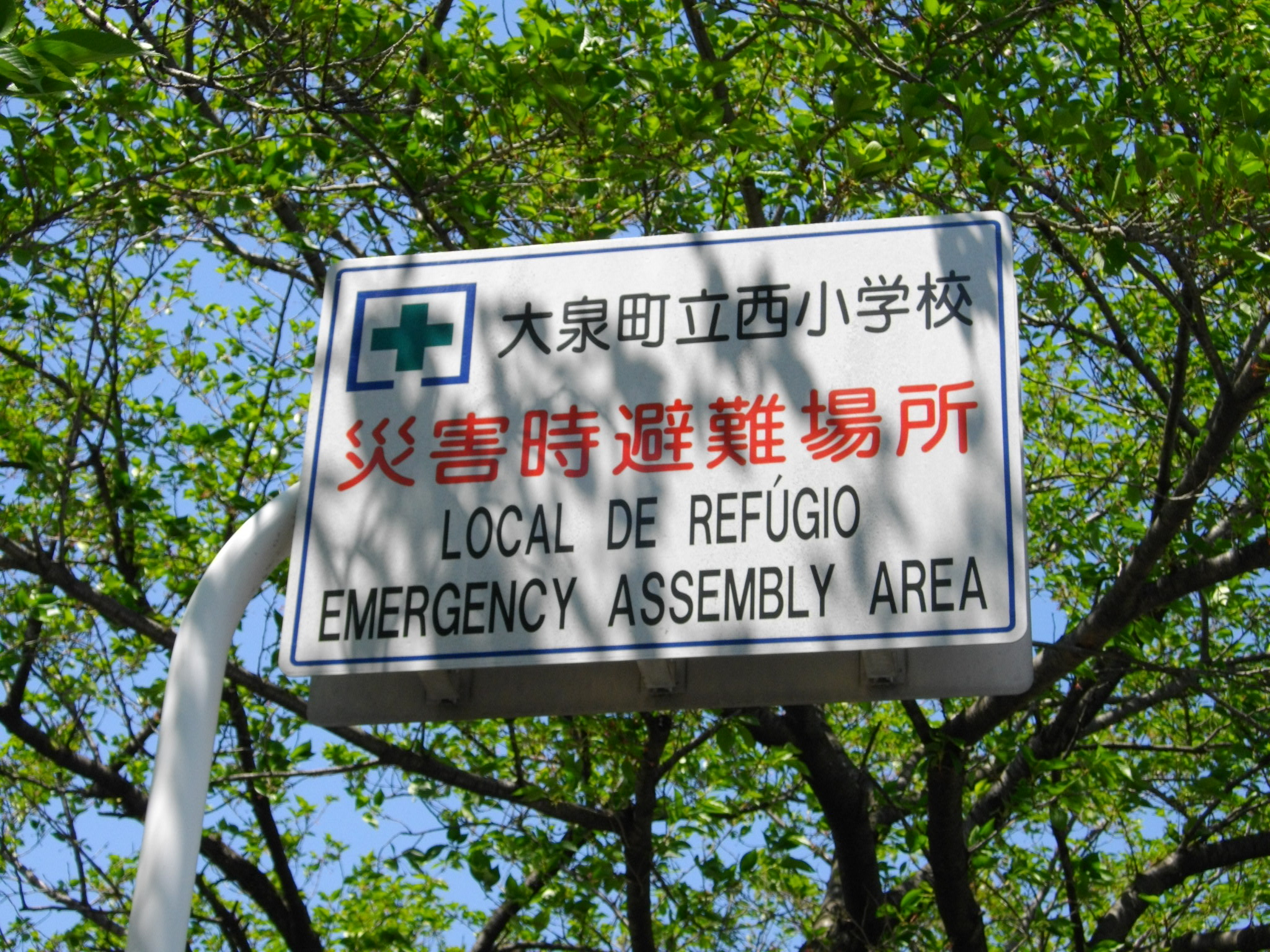
Sign in Japanese, Portuguese, and English in Oizumi, Japan, which has a large Lusophone community due to the return immigration of Japanese Brazilians

Portuguese is spoken by approximately 200 million people in South America, 30 million in Africa, 15 million in Europe, 5 million in North America and 0.33 million in Asia and Oceania. It is the native language of the vast majority of the people in Portugal, Brazil and São Tomé and Príncipe (95%). Around 45% of the population of Angola speaks Portuguese natively, with approximately 85% fluent; these rates are lower in the countryside than in urban areas. Just over 50% (and rapidly increasing) of the population of Mozambique are native speakers of Portuguese, and 70% are fluent, according to the 2007 census. Portuguese is also spoken natively by 30% of the population in Guinea-Bissau, and a Portuguese-based creole is understood by all. Almost 50% of the East Timorese are fluent in Portuguese. No data is available for Cape Verde, but almost all the population is bilingual, and the monolingual population speaks the Portuguese-based Cape Verdean Creole. Portuguese is mentioned in the Constitution of South Africa as one of the languages spoken by communities within the country for which the Pan South African Language Board was charged with promoting and ensuring respect.

There are also significant Portuguese-speaking immigrant communities in many territories including Andorra (17.1%), Bermuda, Canada (400,275 people in the 2006 census), France (1,625,000 people), Japan (400,000 people), Jersey, Luxembourg (about 25% of the population as of 2021), Namibia (about 4–5% of the population, mainly refugees from Angola in the north of the country), Paraguay (10.7% or 636,000 people), Switzerland (550,000 in 2019, learning + mother tongue), Venezuela (554,000), and the United States (868,900).

In some parts of former Portuguese India, namely Goa, the language is still spoken by about 10,000 people. In 2014, an estimated 1,500 students were learning Portuguese in Goa. Portuguese was also used to file cases in the legal system of Daman and Diu up to the 1970s, with many laws still officially remaining written in Portuguese. Approximately 2% of the people of Macau, China are fluent speakers of Portuguese. Additionally, the language is being very actively studied in the Chinese school system right up to the doctorate level. The Kristang people in Malaysia speak Kristang, a Portuguese-Malay creole; however, the Portuguese language itself is not widely spoken in the country.

=== Official status ===
The Community of Portuguese Language Countries (in Portuguese Comunidade dos Países de Língua Portuguesa, with the Portuguese acronym CPLP) consists of the nine independent countries that have Portuguese as an official language: Angola, Brazil, Cape Verde, East Timor, Equatorial Guinea, Guinea-Bissau, Mozambique, Portugal and São Tomé and Príncipe.

Equatorial Guinea made a formal application for full membership to the CPLP in June 2010, a status given only to states with Portuguese as an official language. Portuguese became its third official language (besides Spanish and French) in 2011, and in July 2014, the country was accepted as a member of the CPLP.

Portuguese is also one of the official languages of the Special Administrative Region of the People's Republic of China of Macau (alongside Chinese) and of several international organizations, including Mercosul, the Organization of Ibero-American States, the Union of South American Nations, the Organization of American States, the African Union, the Economic Community of West African States, the Southern African Development Community and the European Union.

=== Lusophone countries ===
According to The World Factbook's country population estimates for 2018, the population of each of the ten jurisdictions is as follows (by descending order):

Country	Population	More information	Native language of the majority	Spoken by
Brazil	203,062,512	Portuguese in Brazil	Yes	95% as a native language
Angola	35,981,281	Portuguese in Angola	No	45% as a native language, 82% total
Mozambique	32,513,805	Portuguese in Mozambique	No	40% as a native language, 60% total
Portugal	10,467,366	Portuguese in Portugal	Yes	95% as a native language
Guinea-Bissau	2,078,820	Portuguese in Guinea-Bissau	No	5% as a native language, 50% total
Equatorial Guinea^{2}	1,679,172	Portuguese in Equatorial Guinea	No	Small minority as a second language
East Timor	1,340,513	Portuguese in East Timor	No	0.5% as a native language; 50% total
Macau^{1}	682,300	Portuguese in Macau	No	0.5% as a native language, 7% total
Cape Verde	561,901	Portuguese in Cape Verde	No	5% as a native language, 80% total
São Tomé and Príncipe	220,372	Portuguese in São Tomé and Príncipe	Yes	75% as a native language, 99% total
Total	288,588,042	Community of Portuguese Language Countries		

Notes:
1. Macau is one of the two autonomous Special Administrative Regions of the People's Republic of China (the other being Anglophone Hong Kong, a former British colony).
2. Equatorial Guinea adopted Portuguese as one of its official languages in 2007, being admitted to CPLP in 2014. The use of the Portuguese language in this country is limited, but quickly growing.

The combined population of the entire Lusophone area was estimated at 300 million in January 2022. This number does not include the Lusophone diaspora, estimated at 10 million people (including 4.5 million Portuguese, 3 million Brazilians), although there are no official accurate figures for diasporic Portuguese speakers because a significant portion of these citizens are naturalized citizens born outside of Lusophone territory or are children of immigrants, and may have only a basic command of the language. Additionally, a large part of the diaspora is a part of the already-counted population of the Portuguese-speaking countries and territories, such as the high number of Brazilian and PALOP emigrant citizens in Portugal or the high number of Portuguese emigrant citizens in the PALOP and Brazil.

The Portuguese language therefore serves more than 250 million people daily, who have direct or indirect legal, juridical and social contact with it, varying from the only language used in any contact, to only education, contact with local or international administration, commerce and services or the simple sight of road signs, public information and advertising in Portuguese.

=== Portuguese as a foreign language ===
Portuguese is a mandatory subject in the school curriculum in Uruguay. Other countries where Portuguese is commonly taught in schools or where it has been introduced as an option include Venezuela, Zambia, the Republic of the Congo, Senegal, Namibia, Eswatini, South Africa, Ivory Coast, and Mauritius. In 2017, a project was launched to introduce Portuguese as a school subject in Zimbabwe. Also, according to Portugal's Minister of Foreign Affairs, the language will be part of the school curriculum of a total of 32 countries by 2020. In such countries, Portuguese is spoken either as a native language by vast majorities due to their Portuguese colonial past or as a lingua franca in bordering and multilingual regions, such as on the Brazilian borders of Uruguay and Paraguay and in regions of Angola and Namibia. In many other countries, Portuguese is spoken by majorities as a second language. There remain communities of thousands of Portuguese (or Creole) first language speakers in Goa, Sri Lanka, Kuala Lumpur, Daman and Diu, and other areas due to Portuguese colonization. In East Timor, the number of Portuguese speakers is quickly increasing as Portuguese and Brazilian teachers are making great strides in teaching Portuguese in the schools all over the island. Additionally, there are many large Portuguese-speaking immigrant communities all over the world.

Country	Population (July 2017 est.)	More information	Compulsory education	Spoken by
Uruguay	3,444,006	Portuguese in Uruguay	Yes	Significant minority as a native language; significant minority as a second language
Argentina	43,847,430	Portuguese in Argentina	Yes	Minority as a second language
Paraguay	7,052,984	Portuguese in Paraguay	No	Significant minority as a native language
Venezuela	31,568,179	Portuguese in Venezuela	Yes	Minority as a second language
South Africa	57,725,600	Portuguese in South Africa	No	Small minority as a native language
Namibia	2,606,971	Portuguese in Namibia	No	Small minority as a native language
Congo	5,125,821	Portuguese in Congo	No	Small minority as a second language
Zambia	16,591,390	Portuguese in Zambia	No	Small minority as a second language
Senegal	15,411,614	Portuguese in Senegal	No	Small minority as a second language
Eswatini	1,343,098	Portuguese in Eswatini	No	Small minority as a second language

=== Future ===
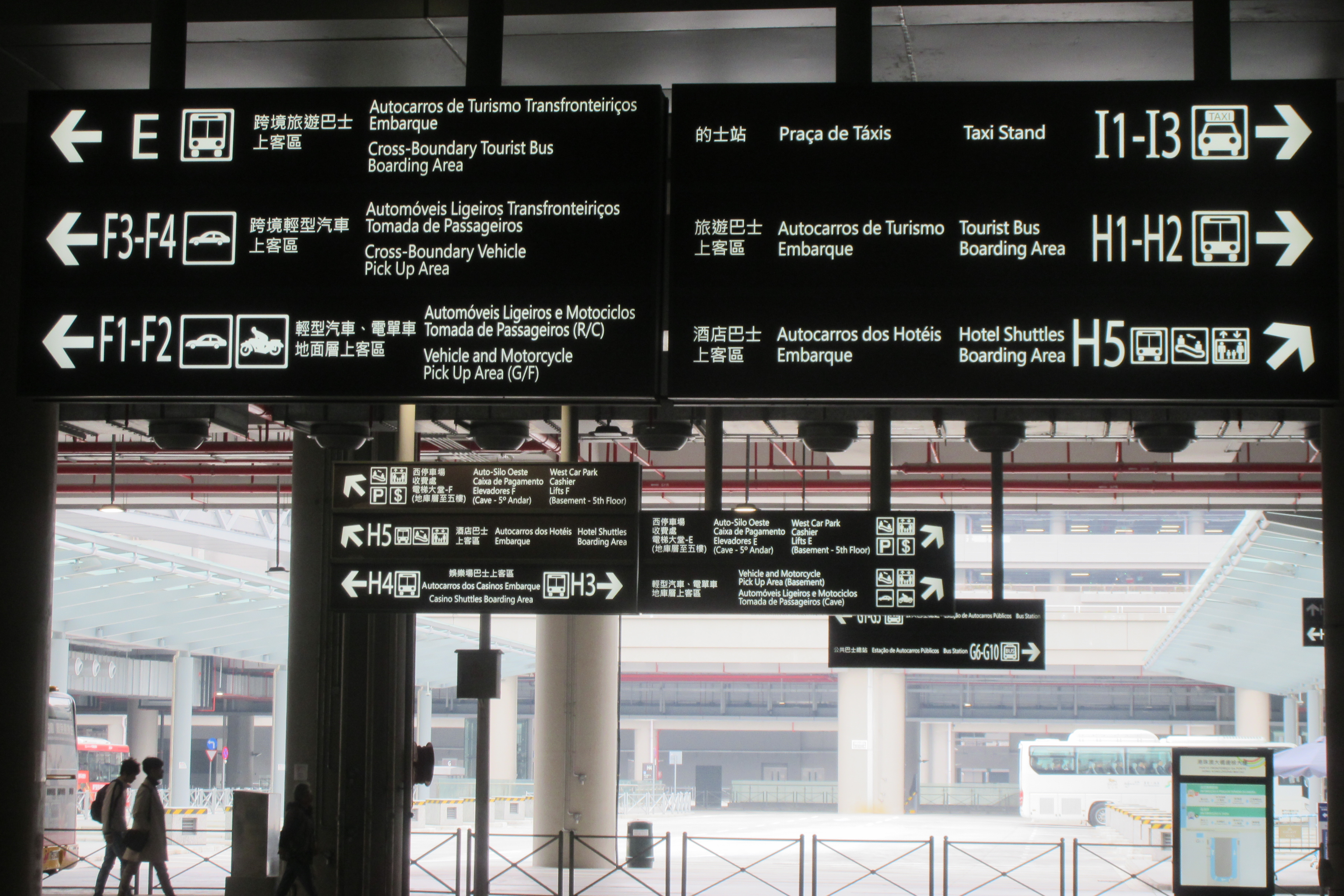
Multilingual signage in Chinese, Portuguese and English at the Hong Kong–Zhuhai–Macau Bridge port building in Macau. Portuguese is a co-official language in Macau.

According to estimates by UNESCO, Portuguese is the fastest-growing European language after English and it has the highest potential for growth as an international language in southern Africa and South America. Portuguese is a globalized language spoken officially on five continents, and as a second language by millions worldwide.

Since 1991, when Brazil signed into the economic community of Mercosul with other South American nations, namely Argentina, Uruguay and Paraguay, Portuguese is either mandatory, or taught, in the schools of those South American countries.

Although early in the 21st century, after Macau was returned to China and immigration of Brazilians of Japanese descent to Japan slowed down, the use of Portuguese was in decline in Asia, it is once again becoming a language of opportunity there, mostly because of increased diplomatic and financial ties with economically powerful Portuguese-speaking countries in the world.

=== Current status and importance ===
Portuguese, being a language spread on all continents, has official status in several international organizations. It is one of twenty official languages of the European Union, an official language of NATO, the Organization of American States (alongside Spanish, French and English), and one of eighteen official languages of the European Space Agency.

Portuguese is a working language in nonprofit organisations such as the Red Cross (alongside English, German, Spanish, French, Arabic and Russian), Amnesty International (alongside 32 other languages of which English is the most used, followed by Spanish, French, German, and Italian), and Médecins sans Frontières (used alongside English, Spanish, French and Arabic), in addition to being the official legal language in the African Court on Human and Peoples' Rights, also in Community of Portuguese Language Countries, an international organization formed essentially by lusophone countries.

== Linguistic demography ==
With approximately 250 million native speakers and 17 million second language speakers, Portuguese has approximately 267 million total speakers. It is usually listed as the fifth-most spoken native language, the third-most spoken European language in the world in terms of native speakers and the second-most spoken Romance language in the world, surpassed only by Spanish. Being the first most widely spoken language in South America and the most-spoken language in the Southern Hemisphere, it is also the second-most spoken language, after Spanish, in Latin America, one of the 10 most spoken languages in Africa, and an official language of the European Union, Mercosul, the Organization of American States, the Economic Community of West African States, the African Union, and the Community of Portuguese Language Countries, an international organization made up of all of the world's officially Lusophone nations. In 1997, a comprehensive academic study ranked Portuguese as one of the 10 most influential languages in the world.

== Classification and related languages ==
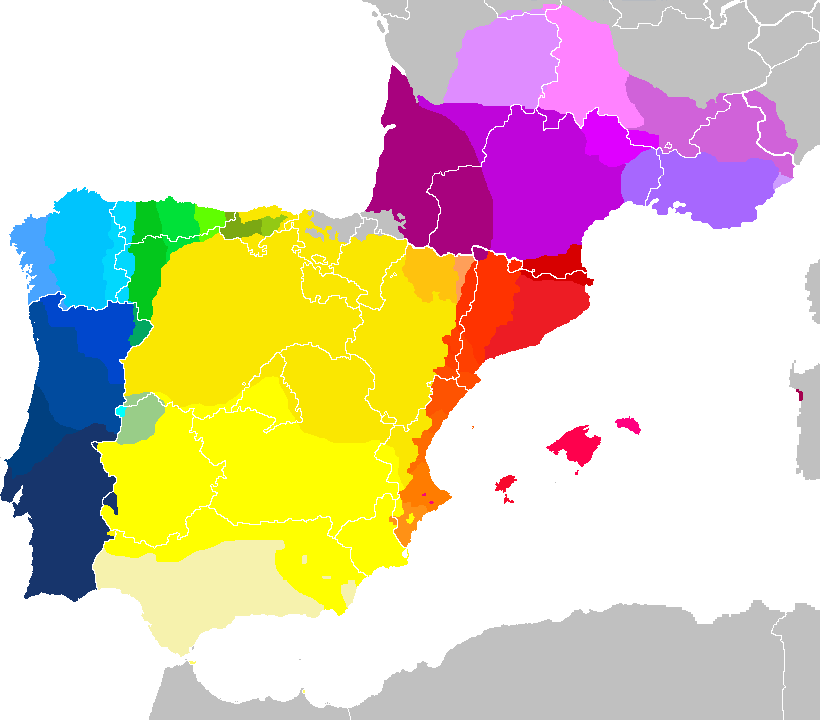
Map showing mostly contemporary West Iberian and Occitano-Romance languages, as well many of their mainland European dialects (areas colored green, gold or pink/purple represent languages deemed endangered by UNESCO, so this may be outdated in less than a few decades). It shows European Portuguese, Galician, Eonavian, Mirandese and the Fala as not only closely related but as dialect continuum, though it excludes dialects spoken in insular Portugal (Azores and Madeira–Canaries is not shown either).

Portuguese belongs to the West Iberian branch of the Romance languages, and it has special ties with the following members of this group:

- Galician and Fala.
- Mirandese, Leonese, Asturian, Extremaduran and Cantabrian (Astur-Leonese languages). Mirandese is the only recognised regional language spoken in Portugal (beside Portuguese, the only official language in Portugal).
- Spanish and calão (the Portuguese term for caló, language of the Iberian Romani).

Portuguese and other Romance languages (namely French and Italian) share considerable similarities in both vocabulary and grammar. Portuguese speakers will usually need some formal study before attaining strong comprehension in those Romance languages, and vice versa. However, Portuguese and Galician are fully mutually intelligible. Spanish is relatively intelligible for lusophones, owing to their geographic proximity and history as West Iberian (Ibero-Romance languages), historical contact between speakers and mutual influence, shared areal features as well as modern lexical, structural, and grammatical similarity (over 85%) between them. Many young Portuguese speakers however, will often choose English as the lingua-franca of choice, with Spanish, French, Italian, other Europeans, and speakers of other languages. Over 97% of 18 to 24 year olds in Portugal speak a second language fluently, 95% of those have English as L2, some 33.7% speak French, 23% German, and 14% Spanish.

Portuñol/Portunhol, a form of code-switching, has a lively use and is mentioned in popular culture in South America. Said code-switching is not to be confused with the Portuguese varieties spoken on the borders of Brazil with Uruguay (dialeto do pampa) and Paraguay (dialeto dos brasiguaios), and of Portugal with Spain (barranquenho), that are Portuguese dialects spoken natively by thousands of people, which have been heavily influenced by Spanish.

Portuguese and Spanish are the only Ibero-Romance languages, and perhaps the only Romance languages in Latin-America, with such thriving inter-language forms, in which visible and lively bilingual contact dialects and code-switching have formed, in which functional bilingual communication is achieved through attempting an approximation to the target foreign language (known as 'Portuñol') without a learned acquisition process, but nevertheless facilitates communication. There is an emerging literature focused on such phenomena in South America (including informal attempts of standardization of the linguistic continua and their usage).

=== Galician–Portuguese in Spain ===
The closest relative of Portuguese is Galician, which is spoken in the autonomous community and historical nationality of Galicia (Spain). The two were part of a common dialect continuum during the Middle Ages, known today as Galician–Portuguese, but they have diverged especially in pronunciation and vocabulary due to the political separation of Portugal from Galicia. There is, however, still a linguistic continuity consisting of the variant of Galician referred to as galego-português baixo-limiao, which is spoken in several Galician and Portuguese villages within the transboundary biosphere reserve of Gerês-Xurés. It is "considered a rarity, a living vestige of the medieval language that ranged from Cantabria to Mondego [...]". As reported by UNESCO, due to the pressure of Spanish on the standard official version of Galician and centuries-old Castilianization, the Galician language was on the verge of disappearing.

According to the UNESCO philologist Tapani Salminen, the proximity to Portuguese protects Galician. The core vocabulary and grammar of Galician are noticeably closer to Portuguese than to those of Spanish. Within the EU, Galician, while not being a European Parliament official language, can be used and is in fact used by some European Parliament constituents due to its similarity with Portuguese. Galician like Portuguese, uses the future subjunctive, the personal infinitive, and the synthetic pluperfect. Mutual intelligibility estimated at 85% is excellent between Galicians and Portuguese. Despite political efforts in Spain to define them as separate languages, many linguists consider Galician and Portuguese to be co-dialects of the same language with regional variations.

Another member of the Galician–Portuguese group, most commonly thought of as a Galician dialect, is spoken in the Eonavian region in a western strip in Asturias and the westernmost parts of the provinces of León and Zamora, along the frontier with Galicia, between the Eo and Navia rivers (or more exactly Eo and Frexulfe rivers). It is called eonaviego or gallego-asturiano by its speakers.

The Fala language, known by its speakers as xalimés, mañegu, a fala de Xálima and chapurráu and in Portuguese as a fala de Xálima, a fala da Estremadura, o galego da Estremadura, valego or galaico-estremenho, is another descendant of Galician–Portuguese, spoken by a small number of people in the Spanish towns of Valverde del Fresno (Valverdi du Fresnu), Eljas (As Ellas) and San Martín de Trevejo (Sa Martín de Trevellu) in the autonomous community of Extremadura, near the border with Portugal.

There are a number of other places in Spain in which the native language of the common people is a descendant of the Galician–Portuguese group, such as La Alamedilla, Cedillo (Cedilho), Herrera de Alcántara (Ferreira d'Alcântara) and Olivenza (Olivença), but in these municipalities, what is spoken is actually Portuguese, not disputed as such in the mainstream.

In the kingdom of Portugal, Ladinho (or Lingoagem Ladinha) was the name given to the pure Portuguese romance language, without any mixture of Aravia or Gerigonça Judenga. While the term língua vulgar was used to name the language before D. Dinis decided to call it "Portuguese language", the erudite version used and known as Galician–Portuguese (the language of the Portuguese court) and all other Portuguese dialects were spoken at the same time. In a historical perspective the Portuguese language was never just one dialect. Just like today there is a standard Portuguese (actually two) among the several dialects of Portuguese, in the past there was Galician–Portuguese as the "standard", coexisting with other dialects.

=== Influence on other languages ===
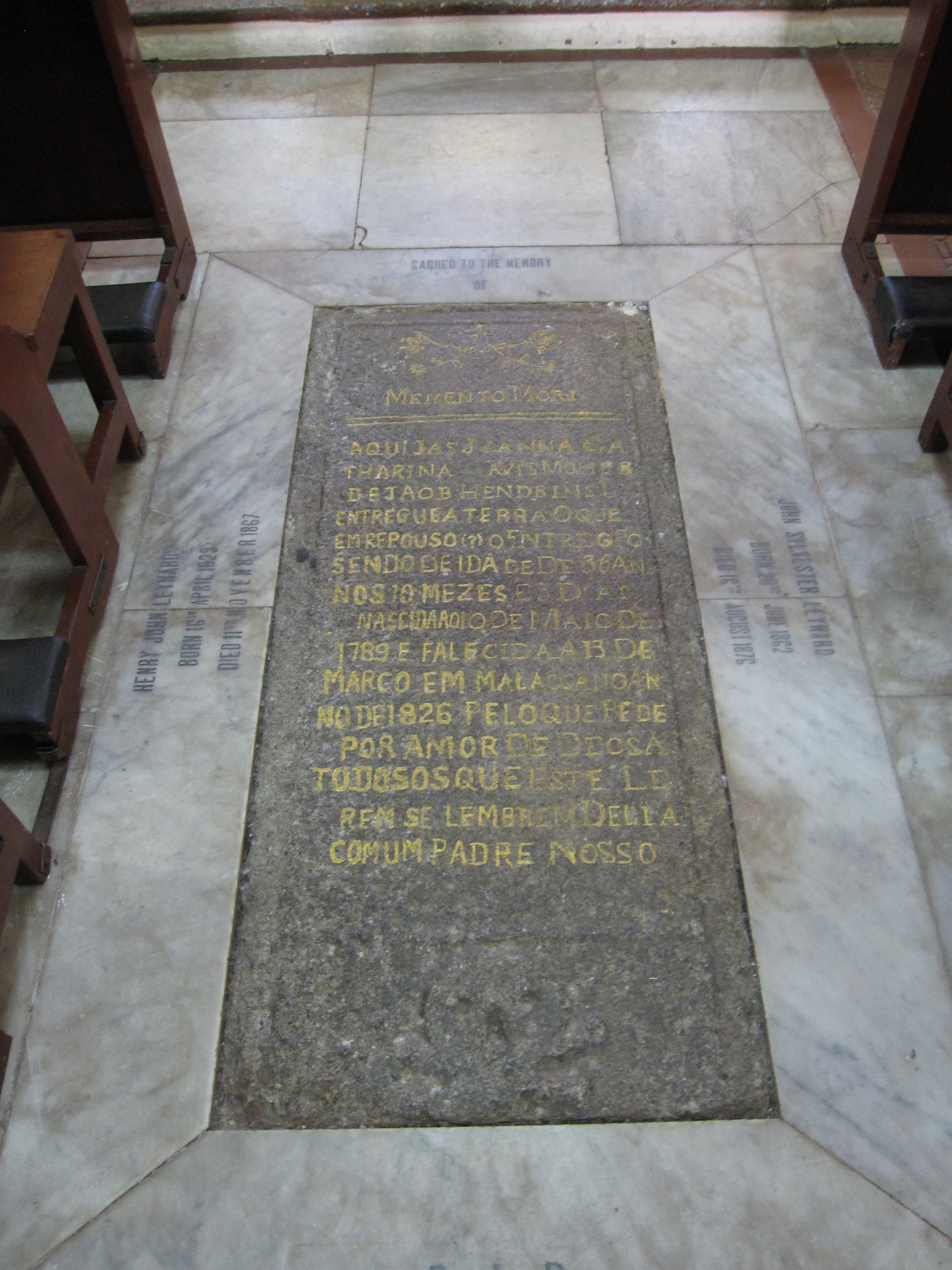
An Old Portuguese memento mori memorial sign in Malacca City

Portuguese has provided loanwords to many languages, such as Indonesian, Manado Malay, Malayalam, Sri Lankan Tamil and Sinhala, Malay, Bengali, English, Hindi, Swahili, Afrikaans, Konkani, Marathi, Punjabi, Tetum, Xitsonga, Japanese, Lanc-Patuá, Esan, Bandari (spoken in Iran) and Sranan Tongo (spoken in Suriname). It left a strong influence on the língua brasílica, a Tupi–Guarani language, which was the most widely spoken in Brazil until the 18th century, and on the language spoken around Sikka in Flores Island, Indonesia. In nearby Larantuka, Portuguese is used for prayers in Holy Week rituals. The Japanese–Portuguese dictionary Nippo Jisho (1603) was the first dictionary of Japanese in a European language, a product of Jesuit missionary activity in Japan. Building on the work of earlier Portuguese missionaries, the Dictionarium Anamiticum, Lusitanum et Latinum (Annamite–Portuguese–Latin dictionary) of Alexandre de Rhodes (1651) introduced the modern orthography of Vietnamese, which is based on the orthography of 17th-century Portuguese. The Romanization of Chinese was also influenced by the Portuguese language (among others), particularly regarding Chinese surnames; one example is Mei. During 1583–88 Italian Jesuits Michele Ruggieri and Matteo Ricci created a Portuguese–Chinese dictionary – the first ever European–Chinese dictionary.

For instance, as Portuguese merchants were presumably the first to introduce the sweet orange in Europe, in several modern Indo-European languages the fruit has been named after them. Some examples are Albanian portokall, Bosnian (archaic) portokal, prtokal, Bulgarian портокал (portokal), Greek πορτοκάλι (portokáli), Macedonian portokal, Persian پرتقال (porteghal), and Romanian portocală. Related names can be found in other languages, such as Arabic البرتقال (burtuqāl), Georgian ფორთოხალი (p'ort'oxali), Turkish portakal and Amharic birtukan. Also, in southern Italian dialects (e.g. Neapolitan), an orange is portogallo or purtuallo, literally "(the) Portuguese (one)", in contrast to standard Italian arancia.

Participating countries of the Lusophony Games

=== Derived languages ===
Beginning in the 16th century, the extensive contacts between Portuguese travelers and settlers, African and Asian slaves, and local populations led to the appearance of many pidgins with varying amounts of Portuguese influence.

As each of these pidgins became the mother tongue of succeeding generations, they evolved into fully fledged creole languages, which remained in use in many parts of Asia, Africa and South America until the 18th century.

Some Portuguese-based or Portuguese-influenced creoles are still spoken today, namely Cape Verdean Creole and Papiamento. Portuguese-based creoles are spoken by over three million people worldwide, especially people of partial Portuguese ancestry.

== Phonology ==
Sara, a native speaker of the European Portuguese of Lisbon

Freddie, a native speaker of the Brazilian Portuguese of São Paulo

Portuguese phonology and phonetics vary across regional dialects, but these differences generally do not impede mutual intelligibility among speakers. Portuguese has one of the larger phonological inventories among the Romance languages. This overview mainly describes European Portuguese (EP) and Brazilian Portuguese (BP), the standard varieties of Portugal and Brazil respectively.

=== Vowels ===
Monophthongs of European Portuguese as they are pronounced in Lisbon, from Cruz-Ferreira (1995:91). The vowel transcribed /ɯ/ on this chart appears only in unstressed syllables and corresponds to the symbol /ɨ/ in this article

Monophthongs of Brazilian Portuguese as they are pronounced in São Paulo, from Barbosa & Albano (2004:229). The vowels [ɪ, ʊ, ë] appear only in unstressed syllables.

Vowel phonemes of Portuguese
	Front		Central		Back	
	oral	nasal	oral	nasal	oral	nasal
Close	i	ĩ	(ɨ)		u	ũ
Near-close	ɪ				ʊ	
Close-mid	e	ẽ			o	õ
Open-mid	ɛ		ɐ	ɐ̃	ɔ	
Open			a			

EP has nine oral vowels (/a, ɐ, e, ɛ, i, o, ɔ, u, ɨ/) and 19 consonants, while BP is generally analyzed as having seven oral vowels in stressed position (/i, e, ɛ, a, ɔ, o, u/). Both varieties have five nasal vowels, though linguists Maria Helena Mateus and Ernesto d'Andrade analyze these as allophones of the oral vowels rather than independent phonemes. Portuguese has ten oral diphthongs and five nasal diphthongs.

In unstressed positions, EP frequently reduces or deletes vowels in colloquial speech, as in dever ('to owe') realized as [ˈdveɾ]. In both varieties, the tense mid vowels /e/ and /o/ tend to raise when unstressed, as in menino ('boy') [mĩ.ˈnĩ.nu]. In BP, this raising is especially consistent in word-final position, while in other syllables tends to vary depending on the accent, where the most common vocalic realizations are /i/, /a/ and /u/, as in sabe ('he/she knows') [ˈsa.bi] and juro ('I swear') [ˈʒu.ɾu]. BP frequently employs vowel epenthesis to break up consonant clusters, typically inserting a high front vowel such as [i] or [ɪ], although many times it can be completely removed or reduced to palatalization ("prática" [ˈpɾatʃikɐ > ˈpɾatʃkɐ]; "truque" ['tɾuki > 'tɾukʲ]). Semivowels contrast with unstressed high vowels in verbal conjugation, as in (eu) rio ('I laugh') /ˈʁi.u/ and (ele) riu ('he laughed') /ˈʁiw/. Phonologists discuss whether their nature is vowel or consonant.

=== Consonants ===
Consonant phonemes of Portuguese
		Labial	Dental/ Alveolar	Palatal(-alveolar)	Dorsal	
		Labial	Dental/ Alveolar	Palatal(-alveolar)	plain	labialized
Nasal		m	n	ɲ		
Plosive/ Affricate	voiceless	p	t	tʃ	k	kʷ
Plosive/ Affricate	voiced	b	d	dʒ	ɡ	ɡʷ
Fricative	voiceless	f	s	ʃ		
Fricative	voiced	v	z	ʒ	ʁ	
Sonorant	median	w	ɾ	j		(w)
Sonorant	lateral		l	ʎ		

EP has 19 consonant phonemes, while BP has 21, including the post-alveolar affricates [tʃ] and [dʒ]. In most Brazilian varieties, the stops /t/ and /d/ are realized as the affricates [tʃ] and [dʒ] before the high front vowel [i], as in tia ('aunt') and dia ('day'). Standard Portuguese distinguishes two rhotic phonemes: a flap /ɾ/, occurring intervocalically written as ⟨r⟩, as in caro ('cheap'), and a guttural R, occurring word-initially (written ⟨r⟩) and intervocalically (written) ⟨rr⟩), as in rato ('rat') carro ('car'). The phonetic realization of the strong rhotic /ʁ/ varies considerably by dialect. In EP, it is typically a uvular trill [ʀ]; however, a pronunciation as a voiced uvular fricative [ʁ] may be becoming dominant in urban areas. There is also a realization as a voiceless uvular fricative [χ], and the historical pronunciation as an alveolar trill [r] also remains common in various dialects. In Brazil, /ʁ/ can be velar, uvular, or glottal and may be voiceless unless between voiced sounds. In syllable-final position, the final rhotic is realized as a tap /ɾ/ (e.g. mar ('sea')]), whereas in BP, it is generally denoted as [ʁ], but vary regionally among glottal or velar fricatives ([h], [x]), a tap [ɾ], or elision.

Portuguese has a strong tendency toward falling diphthongs, in which a vowel is followed by a semivowel, as in feira ('market'), noivo ('fiancé'), ruivo ('auburn'). Sequences of two vowels in separate syllables, known as hiatus, also occur, as in saída ('exit'). The lateral /l/ in syllable-final position is realised as the semivowel [w] in most of Brazil, making alto ('high') and auto ('public deed') phonetically identical in those varieties; in EP, the same consonant is realised as a velarized [ɫ]. Many speakers of BP further shift ɫ to [w] in closed syllables. Bisol (2005:122) proposes that Portuguese possesses labio-velar stops /kʷ/ and /ɡʷ/ as additional phonemes rather than sequences of a velar stop and /w/.

Sibilants in syllable-final position are realised as the palato-alveolar fricatives [ʃ] and [ʒ] in EP and in the Rio de Janeiro variety of BP, while most other Brazilian varieties retain the alveolar [s] and [z]. In most of Brazil and Angola, the consonant hereafter denoted as /ɲ/ is realized as a nasal palatal approximant [j̃], which nasalizes the vowel that precedes it: [ˈnĩj̃u]. In northern and central Portugal, the voiced stops (/b/, /d/, and /ɡ/) are usually lenited to fricatives [β], [ð], and [ɣ], respectively, except at the beginning of words or after nasal vowels.

=== Stress, rhythm and intonation ===
Prosodically, syllabic stress in Portuguese falls on one of the last three syllables of a word. Paroxytones, with stress on the penultimate syllable, are the most frequent pattern, as in barro ('clay') and poderoso ('powerful'), followed by oxytones, with stress on the final syllable, as in café ('coffee') and principal ('principal'), and proparoxytones, with stress on the antepenultimate syllable, as in sólido ('solid') and felicíssimo ('very happy'). European Portuguese is generally described as stress-timed, with unstressed syllables subject to significant reduction. Brazilian Portuguese is more syllable-timed, with unstressed vowels better preserved. In intonation, declarative sentences are typically characterized by a falling pitch contour, while yes/no questions are marked by a rise in pitch on the final stressed syllable; in BP, a pattern with pitch rising on both the first and last accented syllables is common. Wh-questions typically carry a falling contour when seeking information.

== Orthography ==
Portuguese orthography is based on the Latin alphabet and makes use of the acute accent, the circumflex accent, the grave accent, the tilde, and the cedilla to denote stress, vowel height, nasalization, and other sound changes. The diaeresis was abolished by the last Orthography Agreement. Accented letters and digraphs are not counted as separate characters for collation purposes.

The spelling of Portuguese is largely phonemic, but some phonemes can be spelled in more than one way. In ambiguous cases, the correct spelling is determined through a combination of etymology with morphology and tradition; so there is not a perfect one-to-one correspondence between sounds and letters or digraphs. Knowing the main inflectional paradigms of Portuguese and being acquainted with the orthography of other Western European languages can be helpful.

=== Portuguese Language Orthographic Agreement of 1990 ===
Written varieties
Area	Before 1990		Agreement	Translation
Area	Euro-African	Brazilian	Agreement	Translation
Different pronunciation	anónimo	anônimo	Both forms remain	anonymous
Different pronunciation	Vénus	Vênus	Both forms remain	Venus
Different pronunciation	facto	fato	Both forms remain	fact
Different pronunciation	ideia	idéia	ideia	idea
Silent consonants	acção	ação	ação	action
Silent consonants	direcção	direção	direção	direction
Silent consonants	eléctrico	elétrico	elétrico	electric
Silent consonants	óptimo	ótimo	ótimo	optimal
Diacritics	pinguim	pingüim	pinguim	penguin
Diacritics	voo	vôo	voo	flight
Non-personal and non-geographical names	Janeiro	janeiro	janeiro	January

== Grammar ==
A notable aspect of the grammar of Portuguese is the verb. Morphologically, more verbal inflections from classical Latin have been preserved by Portuguese than by any other major Romance language. Portuguese and Spanish share very similar grammar, vocabulary and sentence structure. Portuguese also has some grammatical innovations not found in other Romance languages (except Galician and Fala):

- The present perfect has an iterative sense unique to the Galician–Portuguese language group. It denotes an action or a series of actions that began in the past but expected to occur again in the future. For instance, the sentence Tenho tentado falar contigo would be translated to "I have been trying to talk to you", not "I have tried to talk to you." On the other hand, the correct translation of "Have you heard the latest news?" is not *Tens ouvido as últimas? but Ouviste as últimas? since no repetition is implied.
- Portuguese makes use of the future subjunctive mood, which developed from medieval West Iberian Romance. In modern Spanish and Galician, it has almost entirely fallen into disuse. The future subjunctive appears in dependent clauses that denote a condition that must be fulfilled in the future so that the independent clause will occur. English normally employs the present tense under the same circumstances:

Se eu for eleito presidente, mudarei a lei.
If I am elected president, I will change the law.

Quando fores mais velho, vais entender.
When you grow older, you will understand.

- The personal infinitive can inflect according to its subject in person and number. It often shows who is expected to perform a certain action. É melhor voltares "It is better [for you] to go back", É melhor voltarmos "It is better [for us] to go back." Perhaps for that reason, infinitive clauses replace subjunctive clauses more often in Portuguese than in other Romance languages.

== Vocabulary ==
The Portuguese lexicon consists of around 228,500 entries, 382,000 definitions, 415,500 synonyms, 26,400 antonyms and 57,000 archaic words, according to an estimate based on the 2001 edition of the Houaiss Dictionary of the Portuguese Language. Most of the lexicon of Portuguese is derived, directly or through other Romance languages, from Latin.

A number of Portuguese words can still be traced to the pre-Roman inhabitants of Portugal, which included the Gallaeci, Lusitanians, Celtici and Cynetes. Most of these words derived from the Hispano-Celtic Gallaecian language of northwestern Iberia, and are very often shared with Galician since both languages have the same origin in the medieval language of Galician–Portuguese. A few of these words existed in Latin as loanwords from other Celtic sources, often Gaulish. Altogether these are over 3,000 words, verbs, toponymic names of towns, rivers, surnames, tools, lexicon linked to rural life and natural world.

In the 5th century, the Iberian Peninsula (the Roman Hispania) was conquered by the Germanic, Suebi and Visigoths. As they adopted the Roman civilization and language, however, these people contributed with some 500 Germanic words to the lexicon. Many of these words are related to:

- warfare, such as espora 'spur', estaca ('stake'), and guerra ('war'), from Gothic *spaúra, *stakka, and *wirro respectively;
- natural world, such as suino ('swine') from *sweina, gavião ('hawk') from *gabilans, vaga ('spot') from *vigan;
- human emotions, such as orgulho or orgulhoso ('pride', 'proud') from Old Germanic *urguol, and
- verbs like gravar ('to craft, record, graft') from *graba or esmagar ('to squeeze, quash, grind') from Suebian *magōn or esfarrapar ('to shred') from *harpō.

The Germanic languages influence also exists in toponymic surnames and patronymic surnames borne by Visigoth sovereigns and their descendants, and it dwells on placenames such as Ermesinde, Esposende and Resende where sinde and sende are derived from the Germanic sinths ('military expedition') and in the case of Resende, the prefix re comes from Germanic reths ('council'). Other examples of Portuguese names, surnames and town names of Germanic toponymic origin include Henrique, Henriques, Vermoim, Mandim, Calquim, Baguim, Gemunde, Guetim, Sermonde and many more, are quite common mainly in the old Suebi and later Visigothic dominated regions, covering today's Northern half of Portugal and Galicia.

Between the 9th and early 13th centuries, Portuguese acquired some 400 to 600 words from Arabic by influence of Moorish Iberia. They are often recognizable by the initial Arabic article a(l)-, and include common words such as aldeia ('village') from الضيعة aḍ-ḍayʿa, alface ('lettuce') from الخسة al-khassa, armazém ('warehouse') from المخزن al-makhzan, and azeite ('olive oil') from الزيت az-zayt.

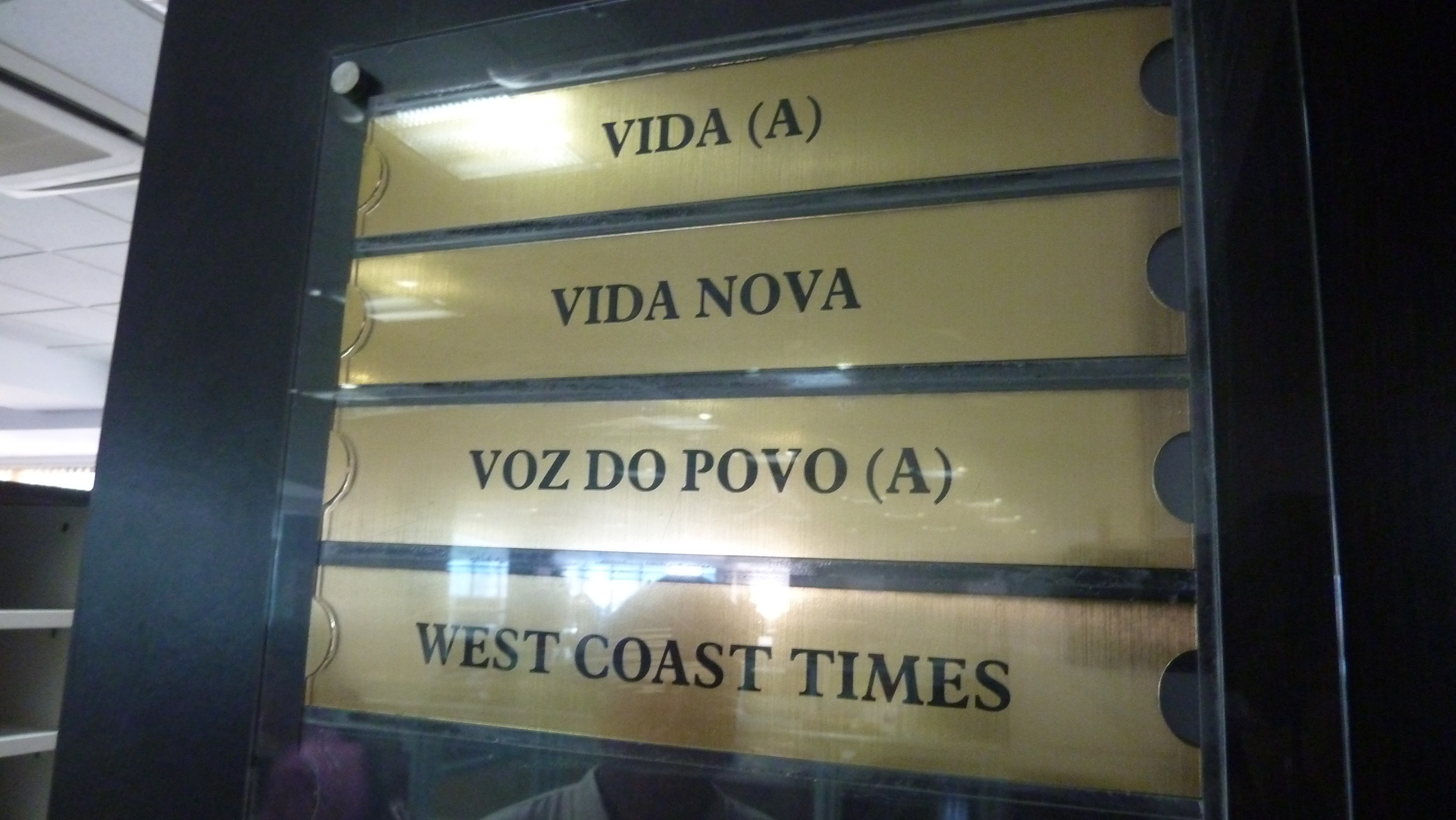
A sign at Goa Central Library, in Panaji, India, listing three Portuguese-language newspapers

Starting in the 15th century, the Portuguese maritime explorations led to the introduction of many loanwords from Asian languages. For instance, catana ('cutlass') from Japanese katana, chá ('tea') from Chinese chá, and canja ('chicken-soup, piece of cake') from Malayalam.

.

From the 16th to the 19th centuries, because of the role of Portugal as intermediary in the Atlantic slave trade, and the establishment of large Portuguese colonies in Angola, Mozambique, and Brazil, Portuguese acquired several words of African and Amerind origin, especially names for most of the animals and plants found in those territories. While those terms are mostly used in the former colonies, many became current in European Portuguese as well. From Kimbundu, for example, came kifumate > cafuné ('head caress') (Brazil), kusula > caçula ('youngest child') (Brazil), marimbondo ('tropical wasp') (Brazil), and kubungula > bungular ('to dance like a wizard') (Angola). From South America came batata ('potato'), from Taino; ananás and abacaxi, from Tupi–Guarani naná and Tupi ibá cati, respectively (two species of pineapple), and pipoca ('popcorn') from Tupi and tucano ('toucan') from Guarani tucan.

Finally, it has received a steady influx of loanwords from other European languages, especially French and English. These are by far the most important languages when referring to loanwords. There are many examples such as: colchete/crochê ('bracket'/'crochet'), paletó ('jacket'), batom ('lipstick'), and filé/filete ('steak'/'slice'), rua ('street'), respectively, from French crochet, paletot, bâton, filet, rue; and bife ('steak'), futebol, revólver, stock/estoque, folclore, from English "beef", "football", "revolver", "stock", "folklore".

Examples from other European languages: macarrão ('pasta'), piloto ('pilot'), carroça ('carriage'), and barraca ('barrack'), from Italian maccherone, pilota, carrozza, and baracca; melena ('hair lock'), fiambre ('wet-cured ham') (in Portugal, in contrast with presunto 'dry-cured ham' from Latin prae-exsuctus 'dehydrated') or ('canned ham') (in Brazil, in contrast with non-canned, wet-cured (presunto cozido) and dry-cured (presunto cru)), or castelhano ('Castilian'), from Spanish melena ('mane'), fiambre and castellano.

== Dialects, accents and varieties ==
Modern Standard European Portuguese (português padrão or português continental) is based on the Portuguese spoken in the area including and surrounding the cities of Coimbra and Lisbon, in central Portugal. Standard European Portuguese is also the preferred standard by the Portuguese-speaking African countries. As such, and despite the fact that its speakers are dispersed around the world, Portuguese has only two dialects used for learning: the European and the Brazilian. Some aspects and sounds found in many dialects of Brazil are exclusive to South America, and cannot be found in Europe. The same occur with the Santomean, Mozambican, Bissau-Guinean, Angolan and Cape Verdean dialects, being exclusive to Africa. See Portuguese in Africa.

Audio samples of some dialects and accents of Portuguese are available below. There are some differences between the areas but these are the best approximations possible. IPA transcriptions refer to the names in local pronunciation.

=== Portugal ===
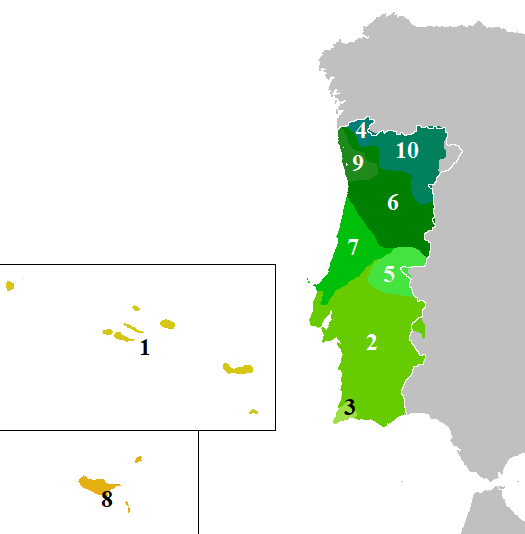
Portugal's Portuguese dialects

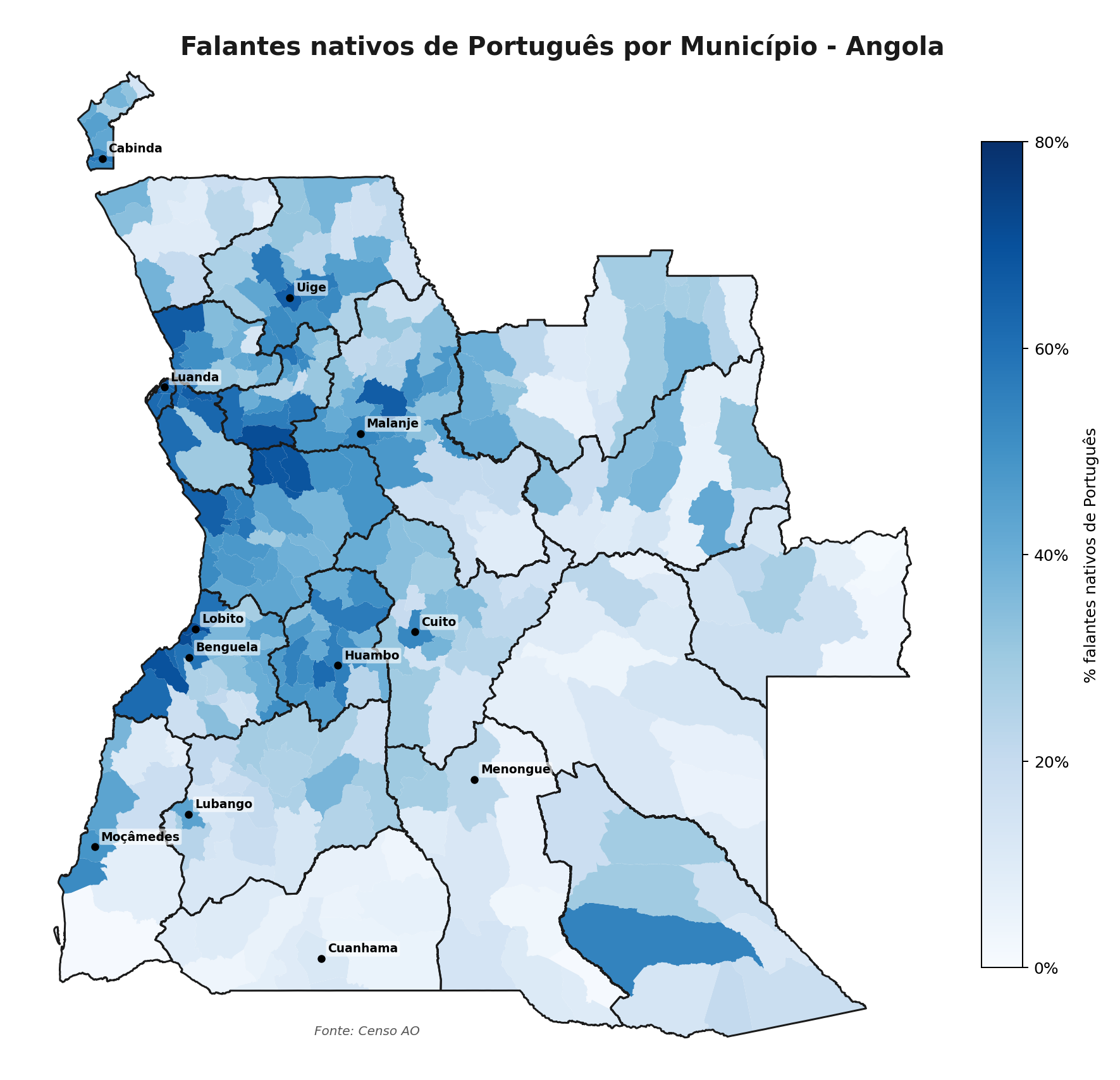
Map of Angola 2024 – percentage of native speakers in each municipality.

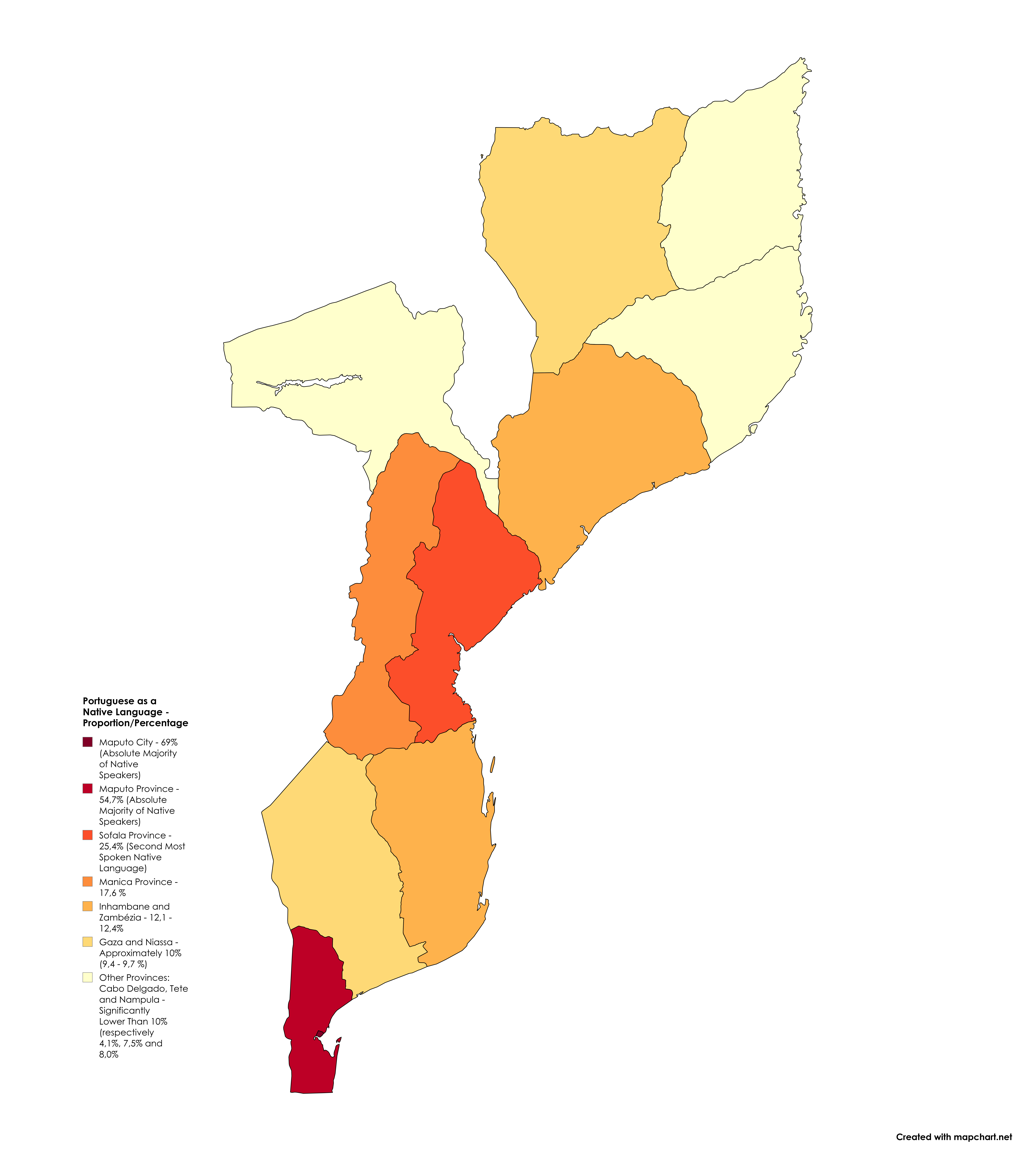
Portuguese as a Native Language in Mozambique – Proportion of Speakers

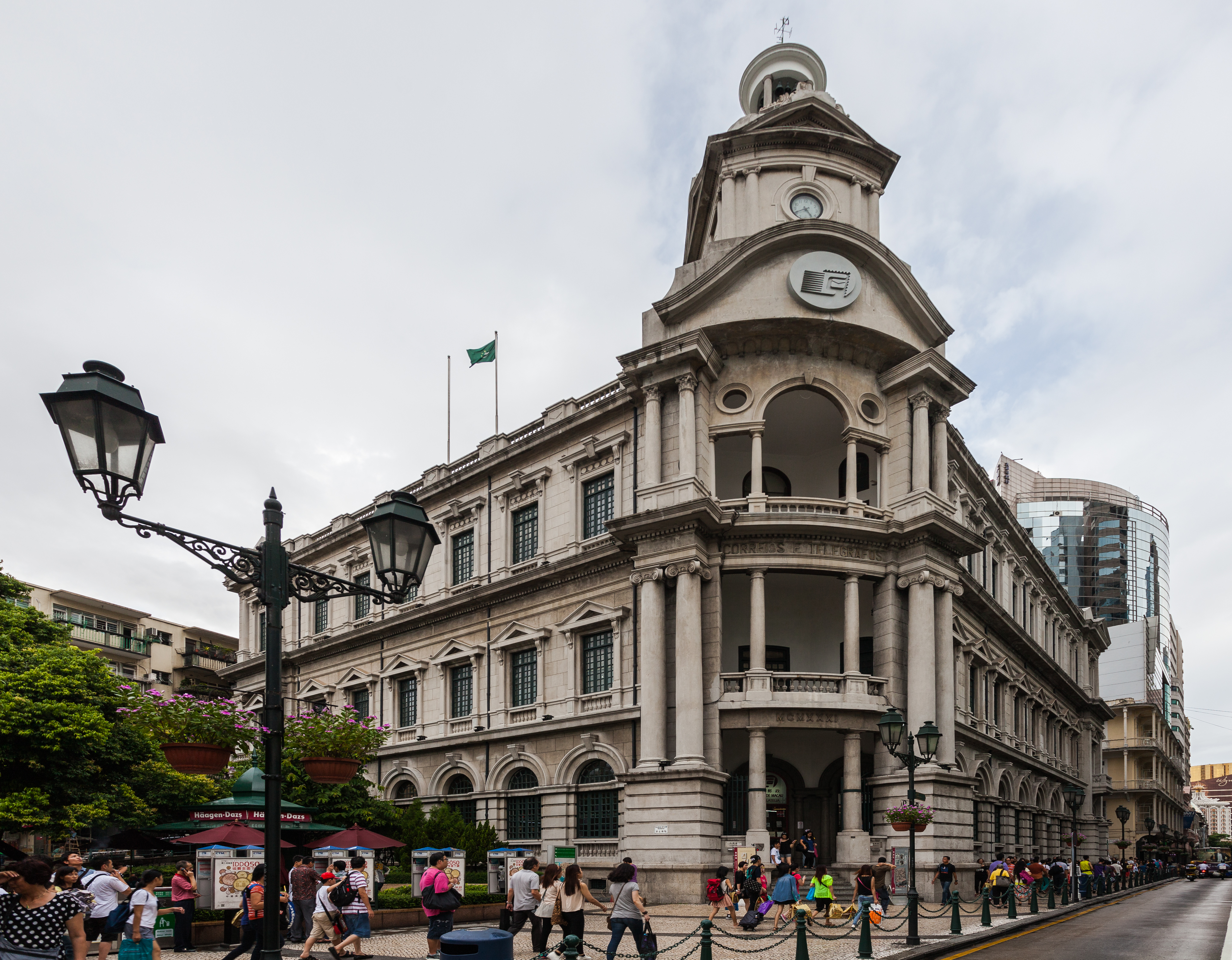
The main post office building of Macau

Percentage of worldwide Portuguese speakers per country (c. 2023)
1. Brazil (80.1%)
2. Angola (9.00%)
3. Mozambique (5.90%)
4. Portugal (4.10%)
5. Others (0.90%)
1. Micaelense (Açores) (São Miguel) – Azores.
2. Alentejano – Alentejo (Alentejan Portuguese), with the Oliventine subdialect.
3. Algarvio – Algarve (Algarvean Portuguese; there is a particular dialect in a small part of western Algarve).
4. Minhoto – Districts of Braga and Viana do Castelo (hinterland).
5. Beirão; Alto-Alentejano – Central Portugal (hinterland).
6. Beirão – Central Portugal.
7. Estremenho – Regions of Coimbra and Lisbon (this is a disputed denomination, as Coimbra and is not part of "Estremadura", and the Lisbon dialect has some peculiar features that are not only not shared with that of Coimbra, but also significantly distinct and recognizable to most native speakers from elsewhere in Portugal).
8. Madeirense (Madeiran) – Madeira.
9. Portuense – Regions of the district of Porto and parts of Aveiro.
10. Transmontano – Trás-os-Montes e Alto Douro.

The status of second person pronouns in Brazil: Near exclusive use of você (greater than 96%) Decidedly predominant use of tu (greater than 80%), but with near exclusive third person (você-like) verbal conjugation. 50-50 você/tu variation, with tu being nearly always accompanied by third person (você-like) verbal conjugation. Decidedly predominant to near exclusive use of tu (76% to 95%) with reasonable frequency of second person (tu-like) verbal conjugation. Balanced você/tu distribution, being tu exclusively accompanied by third person (você-like) verbal conjugation. Balanced você/tu distribution, tu being predominantly accompanied by third person (você-like) verbal conjugation. No data

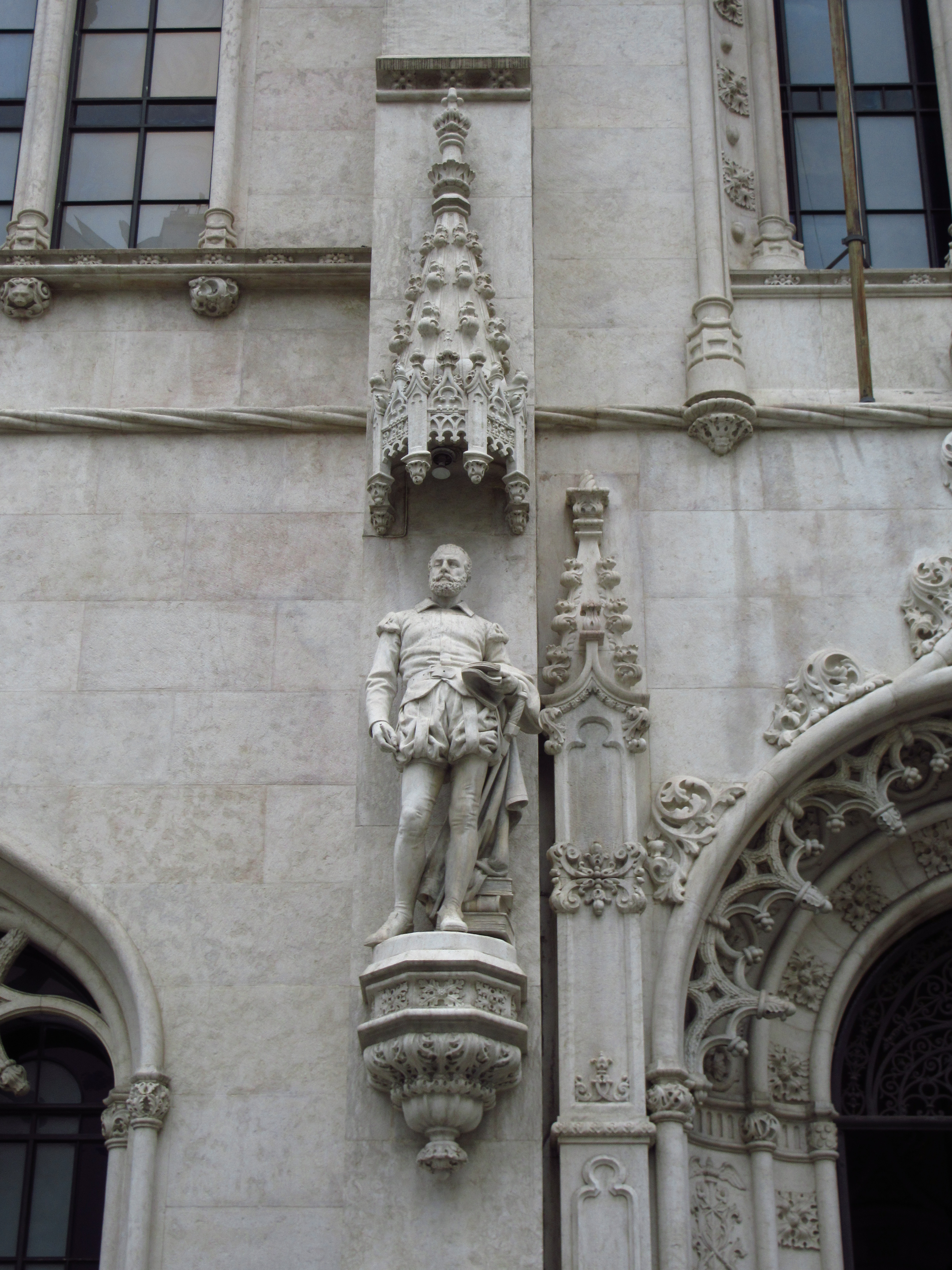
Statue of the Portuguese poet Luís de Camões at the entrance of the Royal Portuguese Cabinet of Reading in Rio de Janeiro

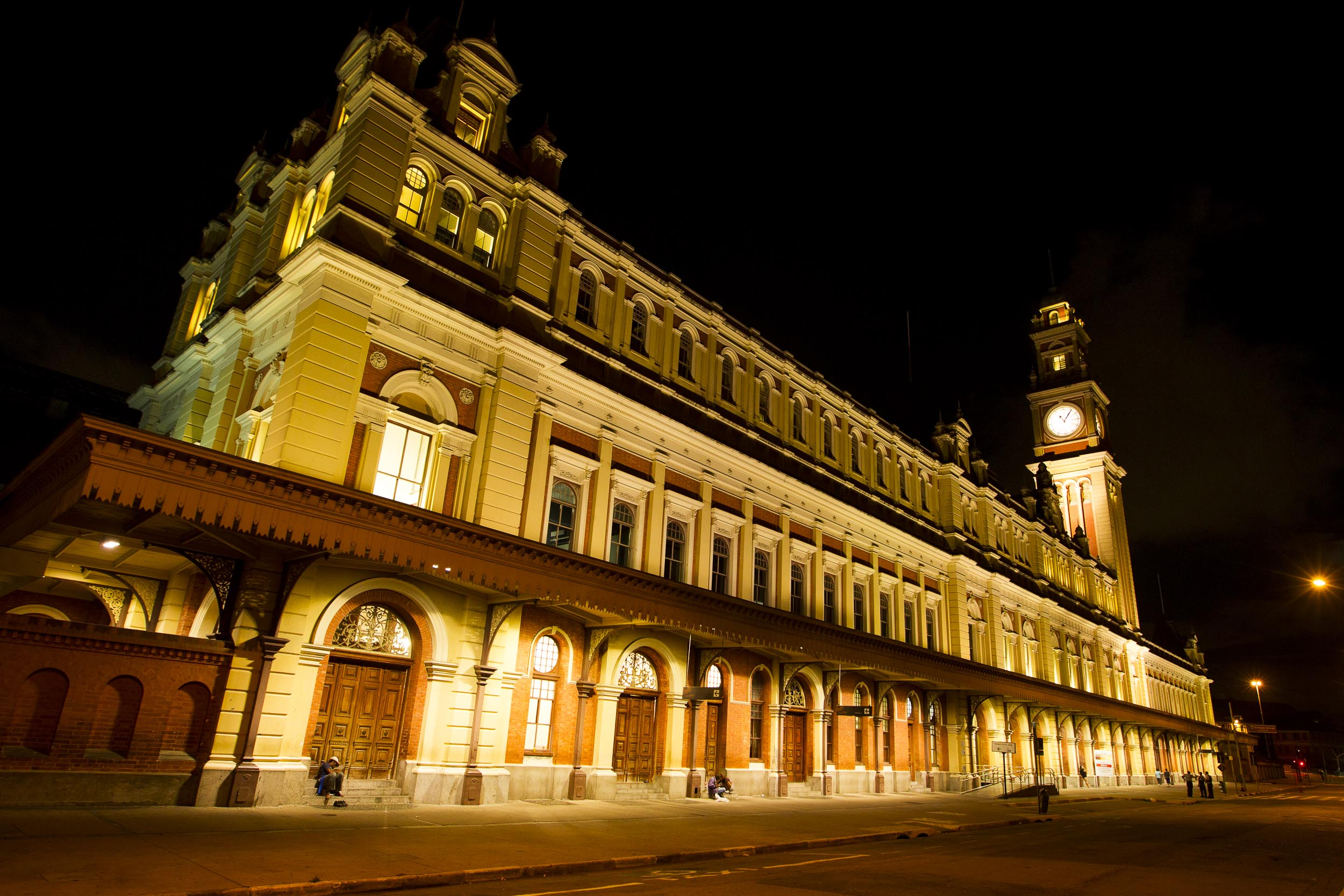
Museum of the Portuguese Language in São Paulo

Audio samples of some dialects and accents of Portuguese are available below. There are some differences between the areas but these are the best approximations possible. IPA transcriptions refer to the names in local pronunciation.

=== Brazil ===
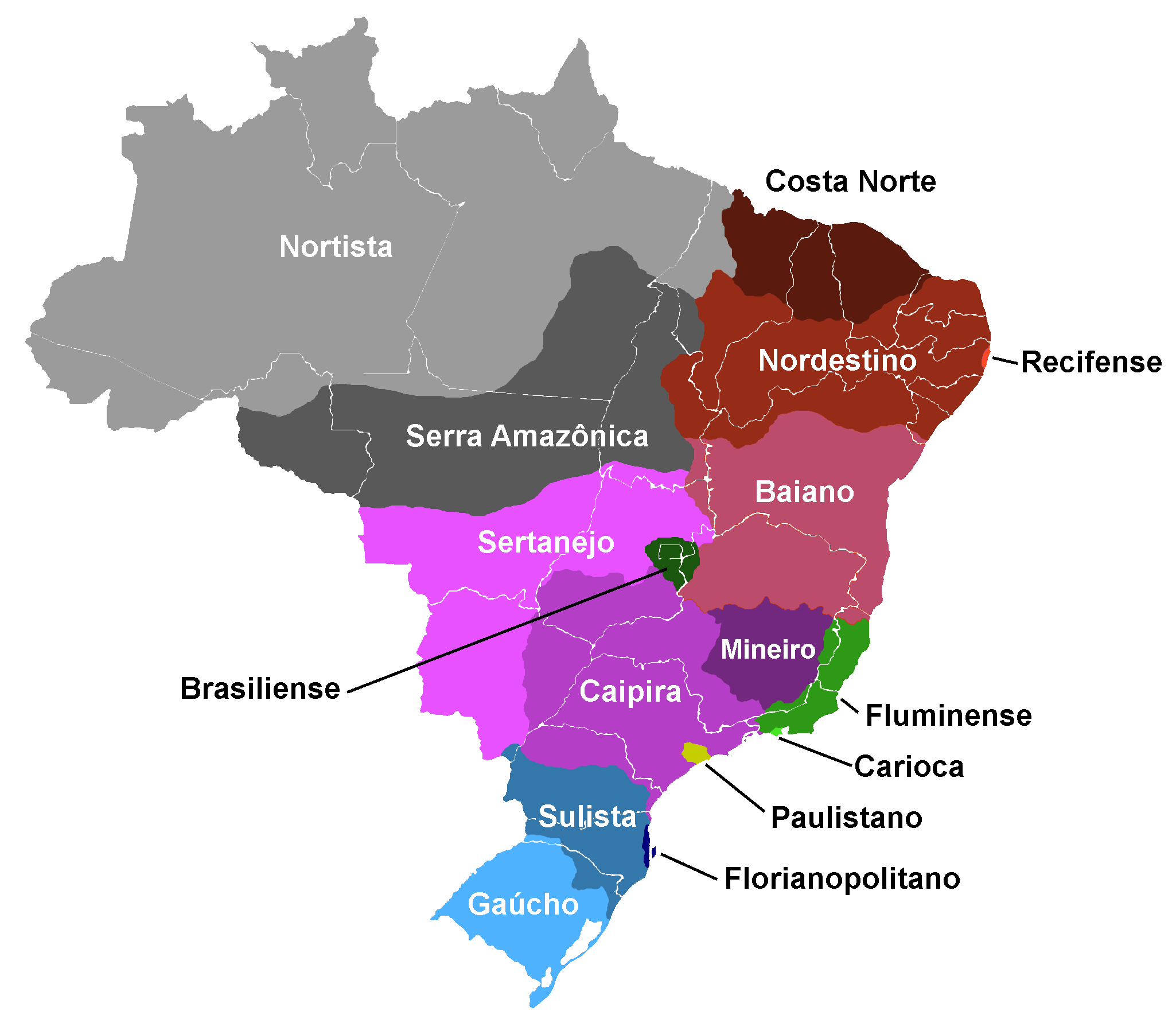
Brazil's Portuguese dialects

1. Caipira – Spoken in the states of São Paulo (most markedly on the countryside and rural areas); southern Minas Gerais, northern Paraná and southeastern Mato Grosso do Sul. Depending on the vision of what constitutes caipira, Triângulo Mineiro, border areas of Goiás and the remaining parts of Mato Grosso do Sul are included, and the frontier of caipira in Minas Gerais is expanded further northerly, though not reaching metropolitan Belo Horizonte. It is often said that caipira appeared by decreolization of the língua brasílica and the related língua geral paulista, then spoken in almost all of what is now São Paulo, a former lingua franca in most of the contemporary Centro-Sul of Brazil before the 18th century, brought by the bandeirantes, interior pioneers of Colonial Brazil, closely related to its northern counterpart Nheengatu, and that is why the dialect shows many general differences from other variants of the language. It has striking remarkable differences in comparison to other Brazilian dialects in phonology, prosody and grammar, often stigmatized as being strongly associated with a substandard variant, now mostly rural.
2. Cearense or Costa norte – is a dialect spoken more sharply in the states of Ceará and Piauí. The variant of Ceará includes fairly distinctive traits it shares with the one spoken in Piauí, though, such as distinctive regional phonology and vocabulary (for example, a debuccalization process stronger than that of Portuguese, a different system of the vowel harmony that spans Brazil from fluminense and mineiro to amazofonia but is especially prevalent in nordestino, a very coherent coda sibilant palatalization as those of Portugal and Rio de Janeiro but allowed in fewer environments than in other accents of nordestino, a greater presence of dental stop palatalization to palato-alveolar in comparison to other accents of nordestino, among others, as well as a great number of archaic Portuguese words).
3. Baiano – Found in Bahia and border regions with Goiás and Tocantins. Similar to nordestino, it has a very characteristic syllable-timed rhythm and the greatest tendency to pronounce unstressed vowels as open-mid [ɛ] and [ɔ].
4. Fluminense – A broad dialect with many variants spoken in the states of Rio de Janeiro, Espírito Santo and neighboring eastern regions of Minas Gerais. Fluminense formed in these previously caipira-speaking areas due to the gradual influence of European migrants, causing many people to distance their speech from their original dialect and incorporate new terms. Fluminense is sometimes referred to as carioca, however carioca is a more specific term referring to the accent of the Greater Rio de Janeiro area by speakers with a fluminense dialect.
5. Gaúcho – in Rio Grande do Sul, similar to sulista. There are many distinct accents in Rio Grande do Sul, mainly due to the heavy influx of European immigrants of diverse origins who have settled in colonies throughout the state, and to the proximity to Spanish-speaking nations. The word gaúcho itself is a Spanish loanword into Portuguese, of obscure Indigenous Amerindian origins.
6. Mineiro – Minas Gerais (but not prevalent in the Triângulo Mineiro). As with the fluminense area, its associated region was formerly a sparsely populated land where caipira was spoken, but the discovery of gold and gems made it the most prosperous Brazilian region, attracting Portuguese colonists, commoners from other parts of Brazil, and their African slaves. The south-southwestern, southeastern, and northern areas of the state each have fairly distinctive speech, actually approximating to caipira, fluminense (popularly and often pejoratively called carioca do brejo, "marsh carioca"), and baiano respectively. Belo Horizonte and the area surrounding it have a distinctive accent.
7. Nordestino – more marked in the Sertão (7), where, in the 19th and 20th centuries and especially in the area including and surrounding the sertão (the dry land after Agreste) of Pernambuco and southern Ceará, it could sound less comprehensible to speakers of other Portuguese dialects than Galician or Rioplatense Spanish, and nowadays less distinctive from other variants in the metropolitan cities along the coasts. It can be divided in two regional variants, one that includes the northern Maranhão and southern of Piauí, and other that goes from Ceará to Alagoas.
8. Nortista or amazofonia – Most of Amazon Basin states, i.e. Northern Brazil. Before the 20th century, most people from the nordestino area fleeing the droughts and their associated poverty settled here, so it has some similarities with the Portuguese dialect there spoken. The speech in and around the cities of Belém and Manaus has a more European flavor in phonology, prosody and grammar.
9. Paulistano – Variants spoken around Greater São Paulo in its maximum definition and more easterly areas of São Paulo state, as well as perhaps "educated speech" from anywhere in the state of São Paulo (where it coexists with caipira). Caipira is the hinterland sociolect of much of the Central-Southern half of Brazil, nowadays conservative only in the rural areas and associated with them, that has a historically low prestige in cities as Rio de Janeiro, Curitiba, Belo Horizonte, and until some years ago, in São Paulo itself. Sociolinguistics, or what by times is described as "linguistic prejudice", often correlated with classism, is a polemic topic in the entirety of the country since the times of Adoniran Barbosa. Also, the "Paulistano" accent was heavily influenced by the presence of immigrants in the city of São Paulo, especially the Italians.
10. Sertanejo – Center-Western states, and also much of Tocantins and Rondônia. It is closer to mineiro, caipira, nordestino or nortista depending on the location.
11. Sulista – The variants spoken in the areas between the northern regions of Rio Grande do Sul and southern regions of São Paulo state, encompassing most of southern Brazil. The city of Curitiba does have a fairly distinct accent as well, and a relative majority of speakers around and in Florianópolis also speak this variant (many speak florianopolitano or manezinho da ilha instead, related to the European Portuguese dialects spoken in Azores and Madeira). Speech of northern Paraná is closer to that of inland São Paulo.
12. Florianopolitano – Variants heavily influenced by European Portuguese spoken in Florianópolis city (due to a heavy immigration movement from Portugal, mainly its insular regions) and much of its metropolitan area, Grande Florianópolis, said to be a continuum between those whose speech most resemble sulista dialects and those whose speech most resemble fluminense and European ones, called manezinho da ilha.
13. Carioca – Not a dialect, but sociolects of the fluminense variant spoken in an area roughly corresponding to Greater Rio de Janeiro. It appeared after locals came in contact with the Portuguese aristocracy amidst the Portuguese royal family fled in the early 19th century. There is actually a continuum between Vernacular countryside accents and the carioca sociolect, and the educated speech (in Portuguese norma culta, which most closely resembles other Brazilian Portuguese standards but with marked recent Portuguese influences, the nearest ones among the country's dialects along florianopolitano), so that not all people native to the state of Rio de Janeiro speak the said sociolect, but most carioca speakers will use the standard variant not influenced by it that is rather uniform around Brazil depending on context (emphasis or formality, for example).
14. Brasiliense – used in Brasília and its metropolitan area. It is not considered a dialect, but more of a regional variant – often deemed to be closer to fluminense than the dialect commonly spoken in most of Goiás, sertanejo.
15. Arco do desflorestamento or serra amazônica – Known in its region as the "accent of the migrants", it has similarities with caipira, sertanejo and often sulista that make it differing from amazofonia (in the opposite group of Brazilian dialects, in which it is placed along nordestino, baiano, mineiro and fluminense). It is the most recent dialect, which appeared by the settlement of families from various other Brazilian regions attracted by the cheap land offer in recently deforested areas.
16. Recifense – used in Recife and its metropolitan area.
17. Amazônico Ocidental — used in the extreme Western Amazon region, namely: Southwestern Amazonas, including the region of Boca do Acre and throughout the State of Acre, which share important historical-cultural aspects, such as, once belonging to Peru-Bolivian Confederation, the First Amazon rubber cycle and Acre Time Zone, sociologically, is considered a homogenous region. Differing from the traditional Northern dialect, in which the phonetic realization of the "s" always has the sound of ch, in the Brazilian Western Amazon region, there will only be the sound of ch whose words the "s" are in the middle of the word, as examples; costa, festa or destino, as well as the one observed in dialect of the north coast. Within the Brazilian countryside, it is one of the few areas where the phonetic realization of "r" resembles those observed in the Carioca dialect (open), other examples where this phenomenon is observed: Brasília dialect and Belo Horizonte dialect.

Você, a pronoun meaning "you", is used for educated, formal, and colloquial respectful speech in most Portuguese-speaking regions. In a few Brazilian states such as Rio Grande do Sul, Pará, among others, você is virtually absent from the spoken language. Riograndense and European Portuguese normally distinguishes formal from informal speech by verbal conjugation. Informal speech employs tu followed by second person verbs, formal language retains the formal você, followed by the third person conjugation.

Conjugation of verbs in tu has three different forms in Brazil (verb "to see": tu viste?, in the traditional second person; tu viu?, in the third person; and tu visse?, in the innovative second person), the conjugation used in the Brazilian states of Pará, Santa Catarina and Maranhão being generally traditional second person, the kind that is used in other Portuguese-speaking countries and learned in Brazilian schools.

The predominance of Southeastern-based media products has established você as the pronoun of choice for the second person singular in both writing and multimedia communications. However, in the city of Rio de Janeiro, the country's main cultural center, the usage of tu has been expanding ever since the end of the 20th century, being most frequent among youngsters, and a number of studies have also shown an increase in its use in a number of other Brazilian dialects.

=== Other countries and dependencies ===
- Angola – Angolano (Angolan Portuguese)
- Cape Verde – Cabo-verdiano (Cape Verdean Portuguese)
- India – Damaense (Damanese Portuguese) and Goês (Goan Portuguese)
- Guinea-Bissau – Guineense (Guinean Portuguese)
- Macau – Macaense (Macanese Portuguese)
- Mozambique – Moçambicano (Mozambican Portuguese)
- São Tomé and Príncipe – Santomense (São Tomean Portuguese)
- Timor-Leste – Timorense (East Timorese Portuguese)
- Uruguay – Dialetos Portugueses do Uruguai (DPU)

Differences between dialects are mostly of accent and vocabulary, but between the Brazilian dialects and other dialects, especially in their most colloquial forms, there can also be some grammatical differences. The Portuguese-based creoles spoken in various parts of Africa, Asia, and the Americas are independent languages.

=== Characterization and peculiarities ===
Portuguese, like Catalan and Sardinian, preserves the stressed vowels of Vulgar Latin which became diphthongs in most other Romance languages; cf. Port., Cat., Sard. pedra; Fr. pierre, Sp. piedra, It. pietra, Ro. piatră, from Lat. petra ("stone"); or Port. fogo, Cat. foc, Sard. fogu; Sp. fuego, It. fuoco, Fr. feu, Ro. foc, from Lat. focus ("fire"). Another characteristic of early Portuguese was the loss of intervocalic l and n, sometimes followed by the merger of the two surrounding vowels, or by the insertion of an epenthetic vowel between them: cf. Lat. salire ("to exit"), tenere ("to have"), catena ("jail"), Port. sair, ter, cadeia.

When the elided consonant was n, it often nasalized the preceding vowel: cf. Lat. manum ("hand"), ranam ("frog"), bonum ("good"), Old Portuguese mão, rãa, bõo (Portuguese: mão, rã, bom). This process was the source of most of the language's distinctive nasal diphthongs. In particular, the Latin endings -anem, -anum and -onem became -ão in most cases, cf. Lat. canem ("dog"), germanum ("brother"), rationem ("reason") with Modern Port. cão, irmão, razão, and their plurals -anes, -anos, -ones normally became -ães, -ãos, -ões, cf. cães, irmãos, razões. This also occurs in the minority Swiss Romansh language in many equivalent words such as maun ("hand"), bun ("good"), or chaun ("dog").

The Portuguese language is the only Romance language that preserves the clitic case mesoclisis: cf. dar-te-ei (I'll give thee), amar-te-ei (I'll love you), contactá-los-ei (I'll contact them). Like Galician, it also retains the Latin synthetic pluperfect tense: eu estivera (I had been), eu vivera (I had lived), vós vivêreis (you had lived). Romanian also has this tense, but uses the -s- form.

== Sample text ==
Article 1 of the Universal Declaration of Human Rights in Portuguese:

Todos os seres humanos nascem livres e iguais em dignidade e em direitos. Dotados de razão e de consciência, devem agir uns para com os outros em espírito de fraternidade.

Article 1 of the Universal Declaration of Human Rights in English:

All human beings are born free and equal in dignity and rights. They are endowed with reason and conscience and should act towards one another in a spirit of brotherhood.

Phonetic transcription (Brazilian Portuguese):

[ˈtoduz us ˈseɾiz uˈmɐnuz ˈnasẽȷ̃ ˈlivɾiz i‿iˈgwajz ẽȷ̃ d͡ʒigniˈdad͡ʒi‿i‿ẽȷ̃ d͡ʒiˈɾejtus | doˈtaduz d͡ʒi ʁaˈzɐ̃w i d͡ʒi kõsiˈẽsjɐ | devẽȷ̃ aˈʒiʁ ũs ˈpaɾɐ kõ‿uz ˈotɾuz ẽȷ̃‿sˈpiɾitu d͡ʒi fɾateʁniˈdad͡ʒi ‖]

Phonetic transcription (European Portuguese):

[ˈtoðuz uʃ ˈseɾɨz uˈmɐnuʒ ˈnaʃsɐ̃j ˈɫivɾɨz i‿iˈɣwajz ɐ̃j diɣniˈðaðɨ‿i‿ɐ̃j diˈɾɐjtuʃ | duˈtaðuʒ dɨ ʁɐˈzɐ̃w i dɨ kõʃsiˈẽsjɐ | ˈdevɐ̃j ɐˈʒiɾ ũʃ ˈpɐɾɐ kõ‿uz ˈotɾuz ɐ̃j‿ʃˈpiɾɨtu dɨ fɾɐtɨɾniˈðaðɨ ‖]

== See also ==
- Angolan literature
- Brazilian literature
- Galician Reintegrationism
- Gallaecian language
- Indo-Portuguese
- International Portuguese Language Institute
- List of countries and territories where Portuguese is an official language
- List of international organizations which have Portuguese as an official language
- List of Portuguese-language poets
- Lusitanian language
- Mozambican Portuguese
- Portuguese Africans
- Portuguese language in Asia
- Portuguese Language Orthographic Agreement of 1990
- Portuguese literature
- Portuguese poetry
