= San Martín de Trevejo =

San Martín de Trevejo, Spain
- Municipality
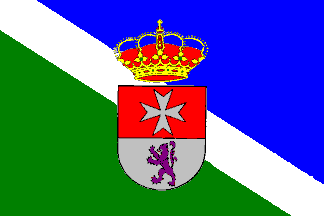
- Flag Coat of arms

- San Martín de Trevejo within Spain
- Coordinates: 40°13′N 6°48′W
- Country: Spain
- Autonomous community: Extremadura
- Province: Cáceres
- Municipality: San Martín de Trevejo

Government
  - Alcalde: Máximo Gaspar Carretero (PSOE)

Area
  - Total: 23.82 km^{2} (9.20 sq mi)
- Elevation: 796 m (2,612 ft)

Population (2025-01-01)
  - Total: 693
  - Density: 29.1/km^{2} (75.4/sq mi)
- Time zone: UTC+1 (CET)
  - Summer (DST): UTC+2 (CEST)
- Website: http://www.sanmartindetrevejo.es

San Martín de Trevejo (Fala: Sa Martín de Trevellu, Fala pronunciation: [ˈsa maɾˈtin ˈde tɾeˈve.ʎu]) is a municipality (municipio) located in the province of Cáceres, Extremadura, Spain. According to the 2008 census (INE), the municipality has 926 inhabitants.

Locally, manhegu (or mañegu) is spoken, a linguistic variety of the Fala language, which differs from both Spanish and Portuguese, but is closer to the latter than the former.

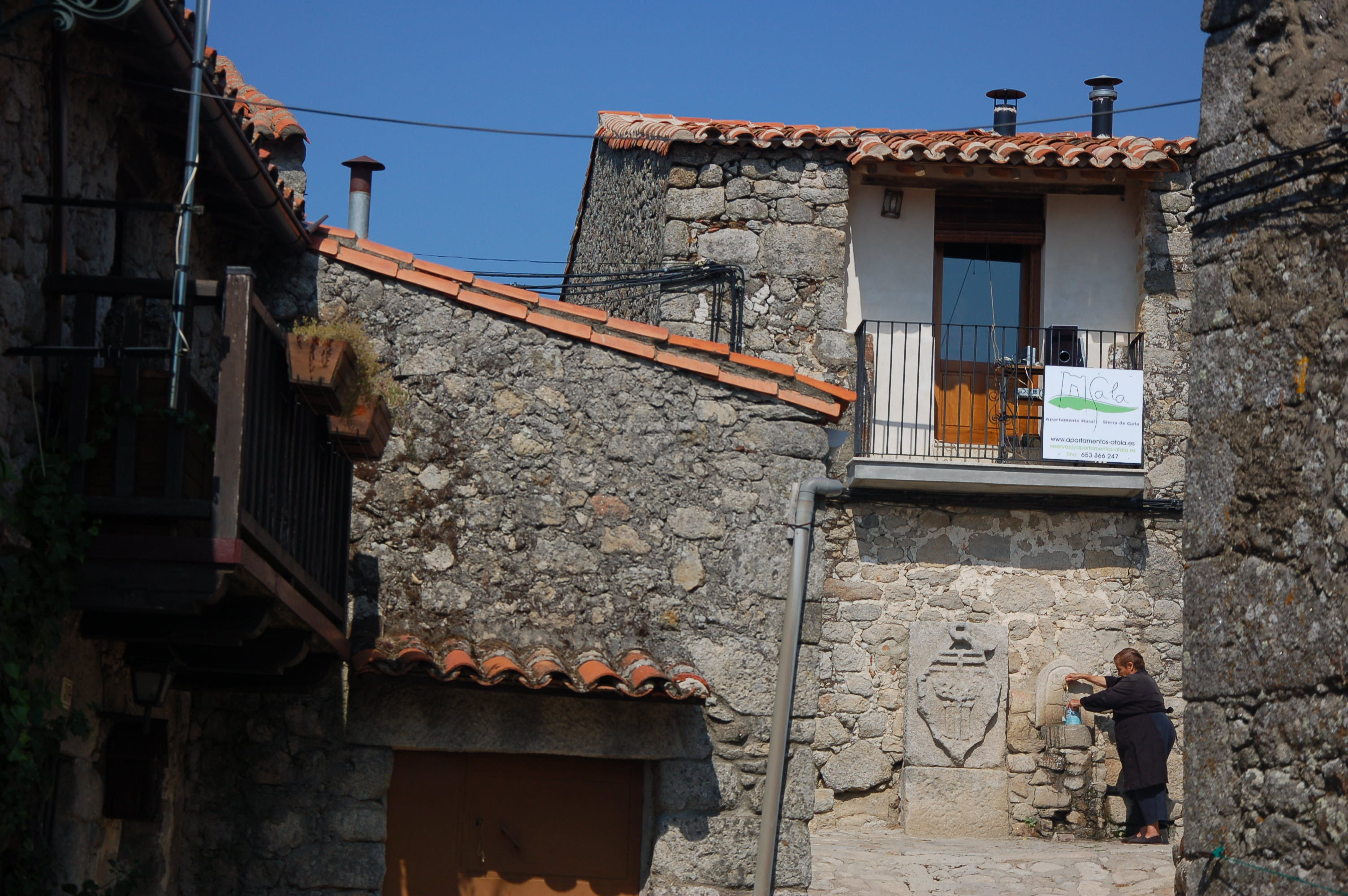
Apartments in the area

== See also ==
- Jálama
- List of municipalities in Cáceres
