= Órganu de siguimientu i cordinación del estremeñu i la su coltura =

The Órganu de siguimientu i cordinación del estremeñu i la su coltura (Monitoring and Coordination Body of Extremaduran and its Culture, OSCEC), is an organization created on February 25, 2011, with the aim of studying and revitalizing the vernacular languages of Extremadura (Extremaduran, Fala, and Portuguese) and protecting the cultural and natural heritage of Extremadura.

== Organization ==
The OSCEC is organized into three thematic commissions: language, literature, and culture. The language commission is responsible for studying the native languages of Extremadura and has created a unified orthography manual for Extremaduran.

The literature commission focuses on the dissemination of literary texts written in any of these languages, while the culture commission deals with the traditional cultural aspects of Extremadura. Since 2021, it has also been responsible for coordinating the Day of Extremaduran Letters.

Its current president is Daniel Gordo.
