= Eljas =

Settlement in Extremadura

Eljas, Spain
- municipality
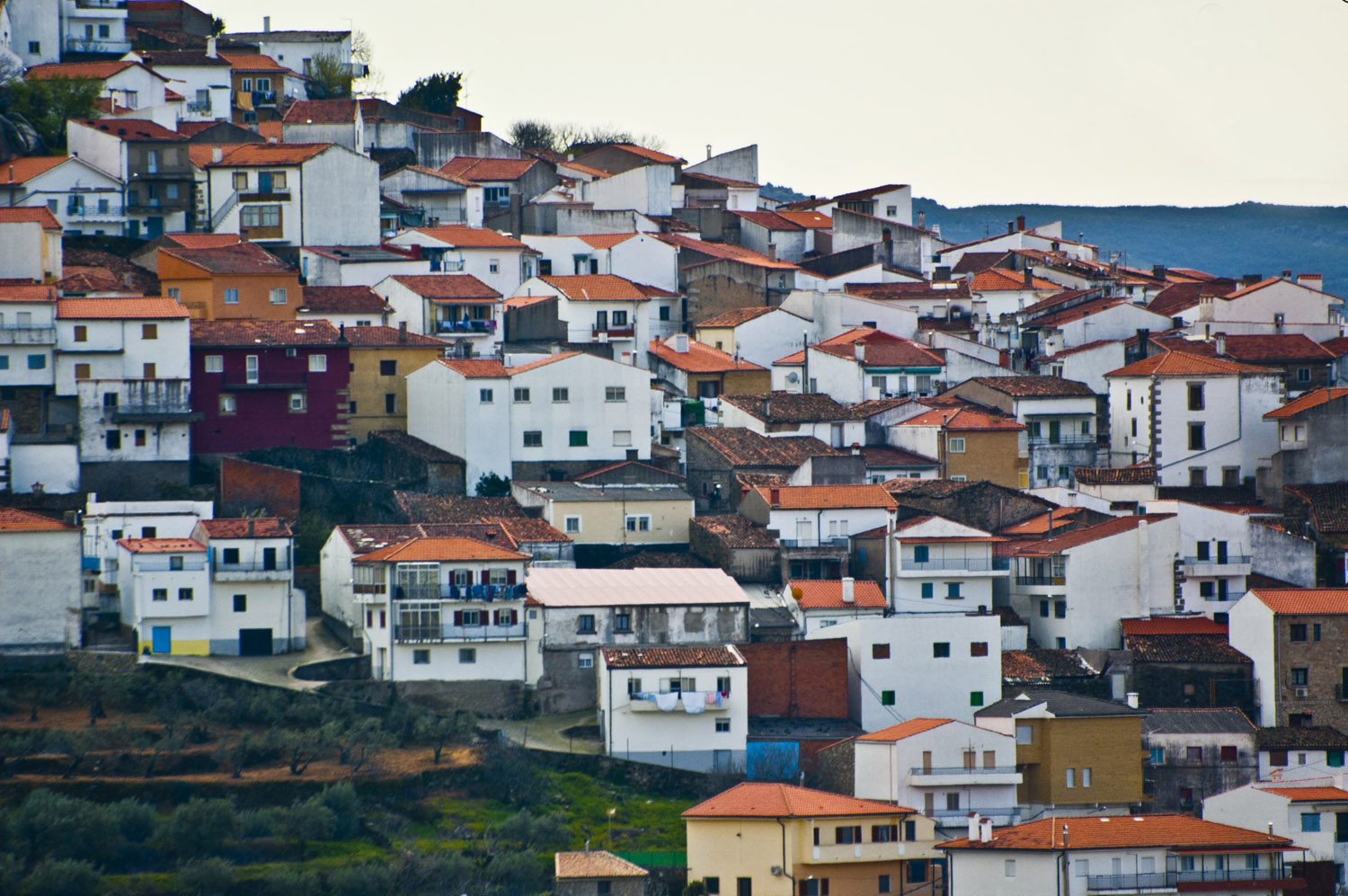
- View of Eljas

- Flag Coat of arms

- Location within Spain
- Coordinates: 40°14′N 6°49′W
- Country: Spain
- Autonomous community: Extremadura
- Province: Cáceres
- Municipality: Eljas

Government
  - Alcalde: Antonio Bellanco Fernández (IPEX)

Area
  - Total: 33 km^{2} (13 sq mi)
- Elevation: 640 m (2,100 ft)

Population (2025-01-01)
  - Total: 827
  - Density: 25/km^{2} (65/sq mi)
- Time zone: UTC+1 (CET)
  - Summer (DST): UTC+2 (CEST)

Eljas (Fala: As Ellas, Fala pronunciation: [ˈas ˈe.ʎas]) is a municipality (municipio) located in the province of Cáceres, Extremadura, Spain. According to the 2008 census (INE), the municipality has 1,046 inhabitants.

The local linguistic variety is the so-called Fala language, different from both Spanish and Portuguese, but closer to the latter.

== See also ==
- List of municipalities in Cáceres
