= Valverde del Fresno =

- municipality
- Flag Coat of arms

- Location within Spain
- Coordinates: 40°13′N 6°52′W
- Country: Spain
- Autonomous community: Extremadura
- Province: Cáceres
- Municipality: Valverde del Fresno

Area
  - Total: 197 km^{2} (76 sq mi)
- Elevation: 468 m (1,535 ft)

Population (2025-01-01)
  - Total: 2,143
  - Density: 10.9/km^{2} (28.2/sq mi)
- Time zone: UTC+1 (CET)
  - Summer (DST): UTC+2 (CEST)

Valverde del Fresno (Extremaduran: Valverdi el Fresnu, Fala: Valverdi du Fresnu, Fala pronunciation: [balˈbeɾ.ði ˈdu ˈfɾes.nu]) is a municipality located in the province of Cáceres, Extremadura, Spain. According to the 2006 census (INE), the municipality has a population of 2576 inhabitants.

The local linguistic variety is the Fala language, different from both Spanish and Portuguese, but closer to the latter.

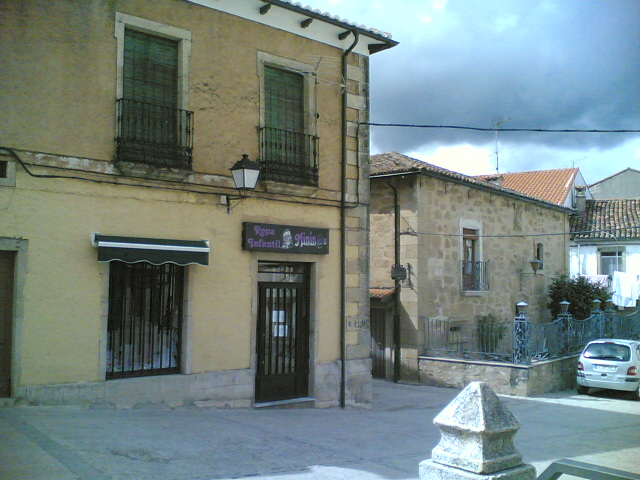
Valverde del Fresno

== See also ==
- List of municipalities in Cáceres
