= Cantiga da Ribeirinha =

Cantiga da Ribeirinha (also known as Cantiga da Garvaia or Cantiga da Guarvaia) is one of the first known pieces of literature in Galician-Portuguese. The poem's date of composition is debated, with some experts placing it in 1189 or 1198, and others claiming it could not have been written before 1200. It was composed by Paio Soares de Taveirós and received its name because it was dedicated to Maria Pais Ribeira, the mistress of Sancho I of Portugal, known as "Ribeirinha."

Using the male I-lyric, the text tells of a platonic love between a poet of low station and a noble and unattainable woman. Although considered a love tune, it is sometimes interpreted instead as a song of derision or slander. Some experts believe that the poem is incomplete, and originally comprised three stanzas, with one having been lost. A recent hypothesis contests the poem's authorship, attributing it instead to Martim Soares de Baguim.

== Lyrics ==
No mundo non me sei parelha,
mentre me for' como me vai,
ca ja moiro por vós - e ai!
mia senhor branca e vermelha,
Queredes que vos retraia
quando vos eu vi em saia!
Mao dia me levantei,
que vos enton non vi fea!

E, mia senhor, des aquelha
me foi a mi mui mal di'ai!
E vós, filha de don Paai
Moniz, e ben vos semelha
d'haver eu por vós guarvaia,
pois eu, mia senhor, d'alfaia
nunca de vós ouve nen hei
valía dũa correa.

=== Modern Portuguese and English ===
No mundo não conheço quem se compare
A mim enquanto eu viver como vivo,
Pois eu moro por vós – ai!
Pálida senhora de face rosada,
Quereis que eu vos retrate
Quando eu vos vi sem manto!
Infeliz o dia em que acordei,
Que então eu vos vi linda!

E, minha senhora, desde aquele dia, ai!
As coisas ficaram mal para mim,
E vós, filha de Dom Paio
Moniz, tendes a impressão de
Que eu possuo roupa luxuosa para vós,
Pois, eu, minha senhora, de presente
Nunca tive de vós nem terei
O mimo de uma correia.

In the world I know no one like me,
while I go on as I go,
for I'd die for you - and oh!
my fair-skinned and pink-faced lady,
You desire me to describe you
when I saw you in your kirtle!
Cursed day when I awoke,
and saw you as ugly no more!

And, my lady, since that day
everything has gone wrong for me!
And you, daughter of Dom Paio
Moniz, it really seems to you
that I received from you a tunic,
but I, my lady, as a gift
have never even received from you
the worth of a leather strap.
