= Paio Soares de Taveirós =

Paio Soares de Taveirós or Paay Soarez de Taveiroos seems to have been a minor Galician nobleman and troubadour active during the second and third decades of the 13th century. He was a brother of the troubadour Pêro Velho de Taveirós. Of his works, six cantigas de amor, three cantigas de amigo, and two tensos (one with Martim Soares and one with his brother) survive.

He may have been one of the earliest authors in Galician-Portuguese lyric, and his Cantiga da Garvaia, a satiric cantiga de amor (or cantiga de escárnio) is one of the most famous poems in the corpus.
