= Jálama =

Mountain in western Spain

Jálama - Xálima - Xálama
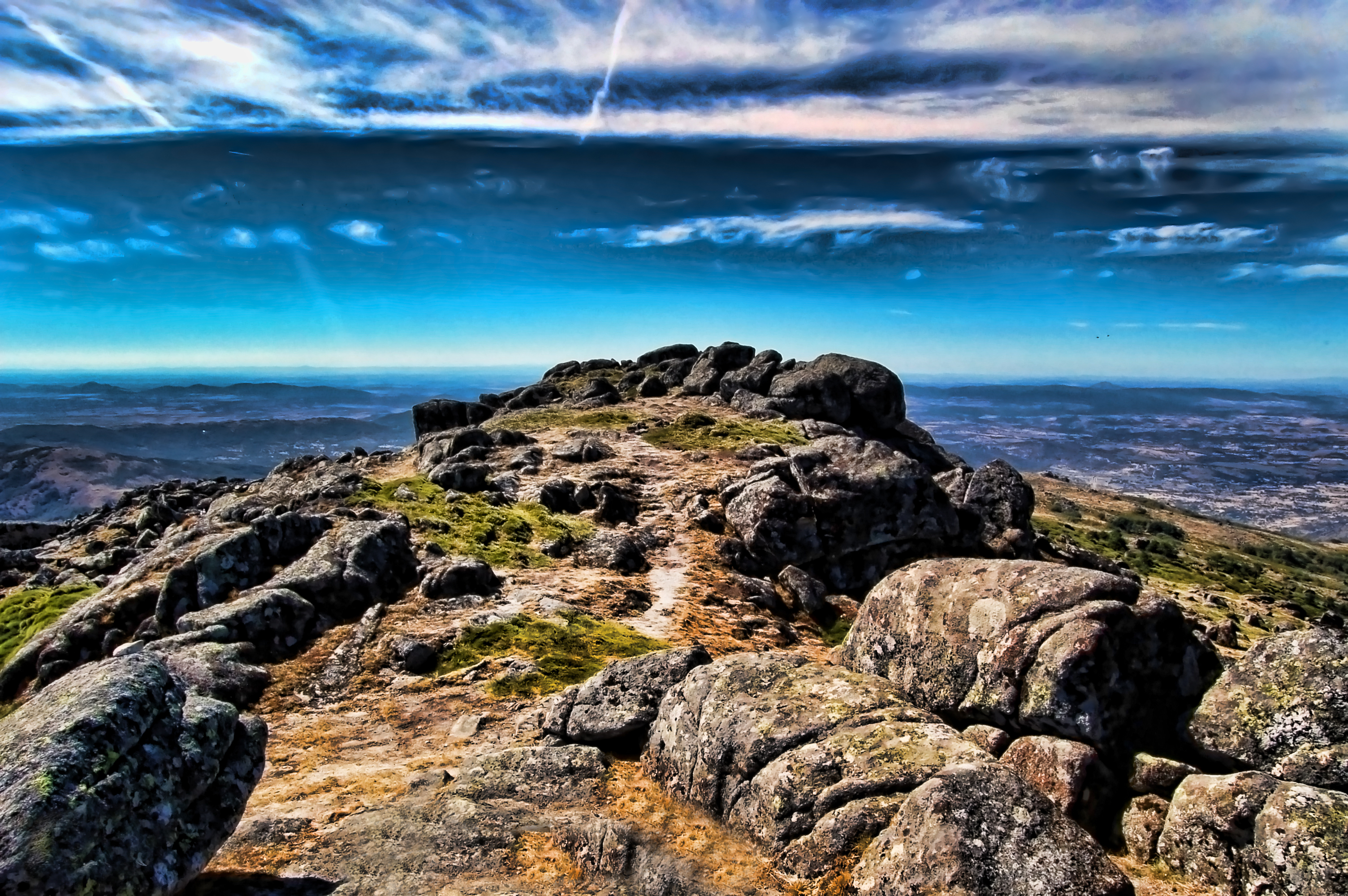
- Top of the mountain

Highest point
- Elevation: 1,487 m (4,879 ft)
- Prominence: 605 m (1,985 ft)
- Coordinates: 40°14′19″N 06°45′20″W

Geography
- Location within Spain
- Location: Cáceres (Extremadura); Salamanca (Castile and León)
- Parent range: Sierra de Gata (Sistema Central)

Climbing
- Easiest route: hike

The Jálama is a 1,487-metre (4,879 ft) mountain in western Spain.

== Etymology ==
In the local language of the northwestern Province of Cáceres, the mountain is known as Xálima. Both names probably come from Paleohispanic languages. The Jálama Valley is home to a Galician-like language, known as Fala.

== Geography ==
The mountain is located on the border between the provinces of Cáceres (autonomous community of Extremadura) and Salamanca (Castile and León). It is one of the highest peaks of the mountain range named Serra de Xálima. Its summit offers a good view of Salamanca's upland.

Around 3 km NE from the summit, the Arroyo de la Cervigona waters create a 60 m waterfall, the highest in the area.

== Access to the summit ==
The summit can be accessed from Acebo, through the Mirador de La Ventosa (794 m) and the mountain pass of Puerto de Perales.

== See also ==
- Sistema Central
