= Fala language =

Ibero-Romance language of western Spain

Fala
- Xalimego
- Native to: Spain
- Region: NW Extremadura
- Native speakers: (11,000 cited 1994)
- Language family: Indo-European: Italic; Latino-Faliscan; Latin; Romance; Italo-Western; Western; Ibero-Romance; West Iberian; Galician–Portuguese; Fala
- Early forms: Old Latin: Vulgar Latin; Proto-Romance; Galician–Portuguese

Language codes
- ISO 639-3: fax
- Glottolog: fala1241
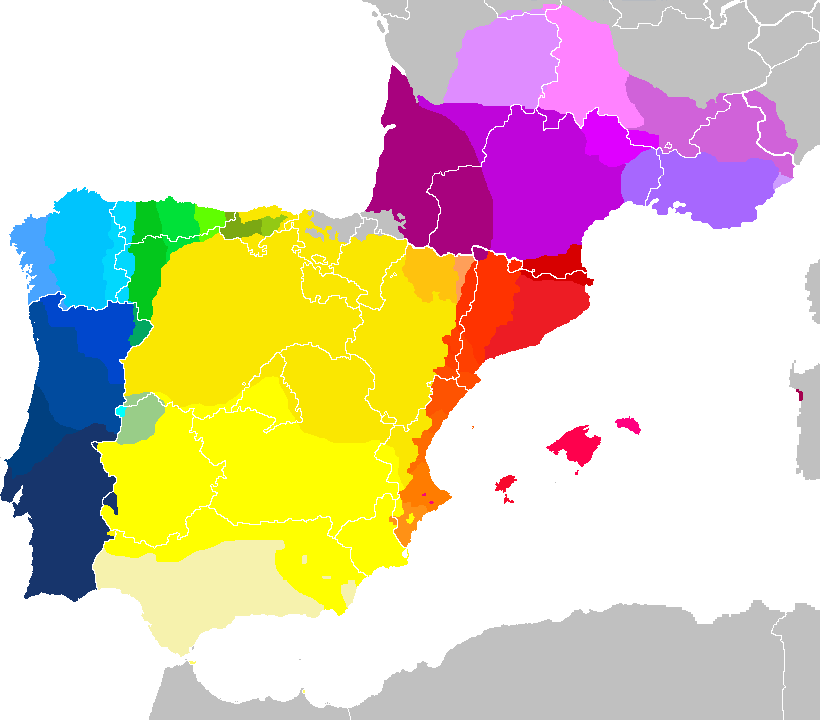
- Fala

Area of the Fala language.

Fala ("speech", also called Xalimego) is a Western Romance language commonly classified in the Galician–Portuguese subgroup, with some traits from Leonese, spoken in Spain by about 10,500 people, of whom 5,500 live in a valley of the northwestern part of Extremadura near the border with Portugal. The speakers of Fala live in the towns of Valverde del Fresno (Valverdi du Fresnu), Eljas (As Ellas) and San Martín de Trevejo (Sa Martín de Trevellu). These are within the valley of Jálama, in the comarca of Sierra de Gata.

Other names sometimes used for the language are Fala de Jálama or Fala de Xálima, but neither of them is used by the speakers themselves, who call their linguistic varieties lagarteiru (in Eljas), manhegu / mañegu (in San Martín de Trevejo) and valverdeñu or valverdeiru (in Valverde del Fresno, where the latter term is considered derogatory).

== History ==
=== Origins ===
In the Middle Ages, mixed varieties of Portuguese and Leonese could be found along the border between Leon and Portugal, represented in texts such as the Foro de Castelo Rodrigo (13th century). Although there is no documentation on the colonization and repopulation of this area in the 13th century, there are several hypotheses of Galician citizens moving to protect the frontier against Muslims as a punishment imposed by the Leonese king, or the delivery of the territories to various military orders by Kings Alfonso IX and Fernando II.

In general, philologists in favor of the Galician theory support the hypothesis that the valley is an isolated region and, therefore, the Galician colonists maintain their way of speaking in a "pure" form because of the lack of external influences. However, the valley is contiguous to the Portuguese border, making it a good candidate to be classified into the lands exchanged by Castille and Portugal, by the Treaty of Alcañices. Previously, during the reconquista, the border had a snaky shape. The treaty was done to make it straighter, which broadly was achieved by delivering the Ribacoa to Portugal (Guarda, the ancient border post, is now 40 km (25 miles) westwards of the new one), and receiving the lands east of the Erges-Tagus-Sever rivers, 180 km (110 miles) of frontier delimitated by water-courses. The agreement among monarchs didn't force the populations to a re-settlement, so a few have changed of country, not by their own will, but due to the change of borders.

=== Recent ===
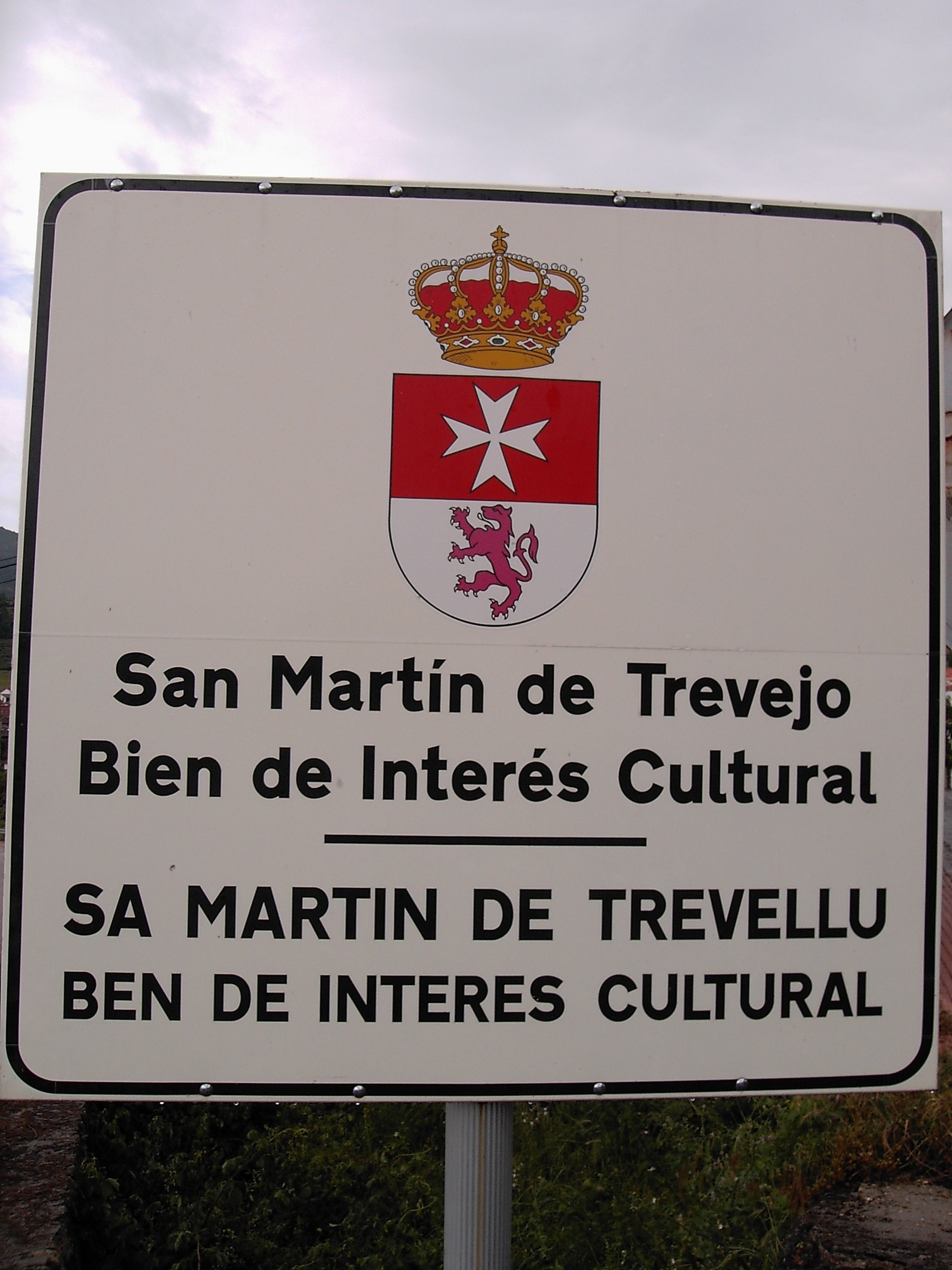
A sign in Spanish and Fala in San Martín de Trevejo

On 3 August 1992, the association Fala i Cultura was founded, among its goals being the compilation of a common grammar (based on the Galician one) and the commemoration of u día da nosa fala (the day of our language) celebrated once a year from 1992 in Eljas, 1993 in Valverde and 1994 in San Martín.

It was not until 1998 that the first literary work in Fala was published: Seis sainetes valverdeiros, written by Isabel López Lajas and published in 1998 by Edicións Positivas (Santiago de Compostela). It was on this date that the Gabinete de Iniciativas Transfronterizas (Office of Cross-Border Initiatives) started to take interest in Fala and to promote its study, publishing in 1999 scientific works and celebrating in May a "Congress on A Fala".

On 14 June 2000, Fala was recognized by the Ministry of Culture of the Junta de Extremadura as Bien de Interés Cultural. Nowadays, although the inhabitants of Jalama Valley can speak Spanish, most of them are bilingual because at home and in other activities outside school, they continue using the local language.

== Sociolinguistic surveys ==
In 1992, a survey conducted by José Enrique Gargallo Gil (a professor at the University of Barcelona) collected the following data regarding the use of Spanish in family conversation:

- 4 of the 29 respondents from San Martín used Spanish when speaking with their family (13.8%)
- In Eljas the figure dropped to only 3 out of 54 respondents (5.6%)
- In Valverde, 25 of 125 respondents used Spanish in this context (20%).

In September/December 1993 a survey was published in issue No. 30 of Alcántara Magazine by José Luis Martín Galindo, which showed the opinion of the people in San Martín de Trevejo as to the nature of Fala in the following percentages:

- Believe that Fala is a dialect of Spanish: 13%
- Believe that Fala is a dialect of Portuguese: 20%
- Believe that Fala is an autonomous language: 67%

The survey involved only twenty people (over 960 neighbours) and there was no alternative answer for those respondents who believed that Fala is a dialect of Galician. It is argued that the absence of this option was logical since theories about the possible relation of Fala with Galician were hardly known.

In 1994, a new study showed that 80% of respondents learned to speak Spanish in school. The percentage of parents who claim to use Fala when speaking with their children was as follows:

- 100% in Eljas
- 85% in San Martin
- 73% in Valverde.

== Phonology ==
Consonant phonemes
	Bilabials	Labiodentals	Dentals	Alveolars	Postalveolars	Palatals	Velars
Nasals	m			n		ɲ	ŋ
Stops	p b		t d				k g
Affricates					t͡ʃ		
Fricatives	(β)	f v	(ð)	s z	ʃ ʒ		(ɣ)
Trills				r			
Flaps				ɾ			
Approximants						j	w
Laterals				l		ʎ	

Vowel phonemes
	Anterior	Posterior
Closed	i	u
Close-mid	e	o
Open	a	

== Orthography ==
It has no regular orthography and when it is written it is based on Spanish. This proposed alphabet based on Portuguese has 23 letters:

Upper case letters
A	B	C	D	E	F	G	H	I	J	L	M	N	O	P	Q	R	S	T	U	V	X	Z
Lower case letters
a	b	c	d	e	f	g	h	i	j	l	m	n	o	p	q	r	s	t	u	v	x	z

== Literature ==
There is not much literature written in Fala. Among the books published in this language is Versus Valeoris da nosa fala - Obra poética mañega, by Domingo Frades Gaspar. It is a collection of poems written by the author over fifty years. There are also some books of Contus y Relatus Cortus.

Other texts in Fala can be found in Anduriña - Revista cultural de As Ellas, published by the cultural association “U Lagartu Verdi” with the collaboration of the City Council of Eljas, which has been published since 1997.

Among the translations we have the Novu Testamentu en fala, translated by Mingu (Domingo Frades Gaspar), and O/U Pequenu Príncipi. Coordinated by Antonio Garrido Correas, it was carried out by three friends: Mingu, Seve, and Pepi (Domingo Frades Gaspar, Félix Severino López Fernández, and José María González Rodríguez).

Cuandu ei tiña seis anus vi, unha ve, unha lámina magnífica in un libru sobre u Bosqui Vilgin que se chamaba 'Historias vivías'".

In 2026, Vicente Costalago published Vérsus sóltus, a book of original poetry written according to the Orthographic Proposal of the UEX.

== Comparative vocabulary ==
Some Fala vocabulary are shown in the table below.

Latin	Galician	Fala	Extremaduran	Portuguese	Spanish	English
hodie	hoxe	hoxii	hoy	hoje	hoy	today
localem	lugar	lugal	lugal	lugar	lugar	place
dicere	dicir	izil	izil	dizer	decir	to say/to tell
oculus	ollo	ollu	oju	olho	ojo	eye
aqua	auga	agua	áugua	água	agua	water
creare	crear	crial	crial	criar	crear	to create

== See also ==
- Galician-Portuguese
- Leonese language
- Portuguese language
- Galician language
- Fala dos arxinas ("stonecutters' speech"), a cant spoken by Galician stonecutters.
- Extremaduran language, from Astur-Leonese roots
- Castúo, or Extremaduran variety of Spanish
- Portuñol

== Bibliography ==
- ADISGATA (2022). "Relatus cortus en fala" (PDF). ADISGATA.
- Carmona García, Ismael (2014). "Ismael Carmona García : O pequenu príncipi fala".
- Garríu Correas, Antòniu (2014). "Pequenu Príncipi".
- príncipi, pequenu (2014). "pequenu príncipi".
- Ramos Ramos, Miguel Angel (2017). "Anduriña - Rivista cultural de As Ellas (Revista cultural de Eljas)".
- Rebollo Bote, Juan (2023). "Literatura nuestra: Versus valeoris da nosa fala". planVE.
