= Medal of Extremadura =

- Coat of arms of Extremadura
- Awarded for: Services rendered to Extremaduran society
- Sponsored by: Government of Extremadura
- Country: Spain
- First award: 1986
- Website: www.juntaex.es/web/medalla-de-extremadura

The Medal of Extremadura (Spanish: Medalla de Extremadura) is the highest institutional distinction of the Autonomous Community of Extremadura, Spain. It was established in 1986, following Decree 27/1986, of 29 April.

It is an annual award, whose number may vary, without exceeding ten medals in the same year, except those granted by courtesy or reciprocity. Such was the case in 2008, in which ten medals were handed out on an ordinary basis, but two were granted in an extraordinary manner to Queen Sofía and the former President of the Government of Extremadura, Juan Carlos Rodríguez Ibarra.

The delivery of the Medal falls to the President of the Regional Government of Extremadura, who by decree awards it, listing the merits for which the prize is obtained. However, any citizen of Extremadura or entity can submit a candidature before the regional administration, which can then be taken into consideration by a commission and subsequently approved by the Governing Council. In this case, up to five medals are reserved, leaving the rest in the judgment of the Chief Executive of Extremadura. In the case of medals for courtesy or reciprocity, the proposal is exclusive of the President.

The winners can be individuals, entities, corporations, or associations that have been outstanding in or out of Extremadura due to their merits or for the services rendered to the region. Thus, the medal has gone to people in the world of arts and sports, political personalities, local corporations, financial institutions, associations, religious congregations, and monasteries, among others.

The Medal of Extremadura is normally presented at an event held on the eve of 8 September, Extremadura Day, at the Roman Theatre of Mérida, capital city of the Autonomous Community.

== Description ==
The Medal of Extremadura has an oval shape, with an axis greater than 60 millimeters and another smaller than 46 millimeters. The obverse has a perimeter fringe of 5 mm, divided into two parts joined by tongues. The upper part is enameled in azure, while the lower part is in gold with the inscription "Extremadura". The enameled coat of arms is housed in the interior oval. On the back, engraved in gold, is an oak leaf with the legend "Junta de Extremadura". In addition, it bears the award date of the medal and the winner's name. The Medal is worn from a braided silk cord in green, black, and white, the colors of the Flag of Extremadura.

The winners are also given an engraved silver plate, where the reason for the concession is explained, as well as a miniature reproduction of the Medal as a badge or lapel pin.

The winners, in turn, are enrolled in a Book of Honor created for this purpose.

== History ==
The first person awarded with the Medal of Extremadura was the then King of Spain, Juan Carlos I, according to the Additional Provision of the decree by which the medal was created in 1986.

Since then, with the exception of 1987, medals have been awarded annually, to over 100 recipients in total. On each occasion, more than one Medal has been given, except in 1988, where it was only granted to the poet Jesús Delgado Valhondo.

In 2008, on the occasion of the 25th anniversary of the approval of the Statute of Autonomy of Extremadura, the Government granted two Medals of an extraordinary nature in a Government Council held in the Monastery of Yuste. One of them was delivered to Queen Sofía at an official reception at the Palace of Zarzuela on 23 June. The other was awarded to Juan Carlos Rodríguez Ibarra, first democratic President of the Government of Extremadura, who retired in 2007 after 24 years in office. The award ceremony was held on 21 May 2008 at the Assembly of Extremadura.

In 2010, the year in which the definitive approval of the reform of the Statute of Autonomy of Extremadura was foreseen, the Government of Extremadura granted the Medal to the Prince of Asturias at that time, Felipe de Borbón y Grecia, in an extraordinary manner as Heir to the Crown. The award ceremony took place in Trujillo on 29 April, on the occasion of an official visit by the Prince and Princess of Asturias, Felipe and Letizia, to the town's National Cheese Fair.

In 2014, after the death of Adolfo Suárez on 23 March, the regional government granted him the Medal posthumously for being the country's first democratic Prime Minister after Francoist Spain, driving the Spanish Transition to Democracy.

There have been no cases of resignation by the winners to date. The only withdrawal of the Extremadura Medal was proposed in 2014, specifically that awarded to the Paralympic swimmer Enrique Tornero in 1996, due to his judicial conviction for prevarication and fraud in his time as a councilor in the City of Plasencia.

== Recipients ==
=== 1986 ===
- King Juan Carlos
- Antonio Hernández Gil, President of the Supreme Court and of the General Council of the Judiciary
- Ricardo Senabre, Dean of the Faculty of Philosophy and Letters of the University of Extremadura (UEX)
- Manuel Pacheco, poet
- Extremaduran Dance Group in Germany
- Extremadura Week in school

=== 1987 ===
- No winner

=== 1988 ===
- Jesús Delgado Valhondo, poet

=== 1989 ===
- Montserrat Caballé, operatic soprano
- Father Francisco de Asís Oterino Villasante, Monastery of Santa María de Guadalupe
- Extremaduran Choral Federation

=== 1990 ===
- El Brocense Institute
- Miguel Durán, ex-president of ONCE

=== 1991 ===
- Juan Barjola, painter
- Eduardo Naranjo, painter
- Juan José Narbón, painter
- Vicent Sos Baynat, geologist and creator of the Extremadura Geology Museum
- Francisco González Santana, creator of the Olivenza Ethnographic Museum
- Federation of Associations for People with Intellectual Disabilities of Extremadura

=== 1992 ===
- Monastery of Santa María de Guadalupe
- Cáceres Training School of Basic General Education (EGB) Professorship

=== 1993 ===
- Mário Soares, President of Portugal
- Rocío Martínez Gragera, athlete

=== 1994 ===
- Badajoz University School of EGB Professorship
- Extremadura Federation of Blood Donor Fraternities
- Extremadura Migrant Associations

=== 1995 ===
- Jesús Usón Gargallo, professor of surgery at the University of Extremadura Faculty of Veterinary Medicine and creator of the Cáceres Center for Minimally Invasive Surgery
- Extremadura Tactical Grouping of the Armed Forces

=== 1996 ===
- Antonio Vázquez López, first president of the Assembly of Extremadura
- Enrique Tornero Hernández, Paralympic swimmer
- Alicia Martinez, Paralympic athlete
- Manuel Julián Rufo Gracia, Paralympic medalist
- Nuria Cabanillas, Olympic gymnast
- Juan Holgado, Olympic archer

=== 1997 ===
- Luis Ramallo, first President of the Regional Government of Extremadura (1978–1980)
- Manuel Bermejo Hernández, President of the Regional Government of Extremadura (1980–1982)
- Esteban Sánchez, Numerary Academician of the Extremadura Royal Academy, pianist, composer, director of the Conservatory of Mérida and professor of Badajoz (posthumous)

=== 1998 ===
- Wolf Vostell, artist
- Alberto Oliart, lawyer and ex-minister of the Government of Spain
- Rafael Ortega Porras, pottery craftsman
- Association of Centers of Popular Culture and Promotion of Women
- International Catholic Association of Services for Young Women

=== 1999 ===
- Eladio Viñuela, scientist (posthumous)
- Joaquín Araújo, naturalist
- Manuel Martínez-Mediero Díaz, dramatist
- Hogar de Nazaret Secular Institute

=== 2000 ===
- Enrique Moreno González, physician
- Reyes Abades, filmmaker
- Pablo Guerrero, singer-songwriter, poet
- Zafra International Cattle Fair
- Extremadura Federation for Drug Addiction

=== 2001 ===
- Ángel Duarte, sculptor and painter
- Dionisio Hernández Gil, architect
- Antonio Montero Moreno, priest, archbishop of Mérida-Badajoz
- Olivenza Philharmonic Cultural Society

=== 2002 ===
- Antonia López González, tropical medicine specialist
- Rogelio García Vázquez, painter
- Teresiano Rodríguez Núñez, journalist and director of the newspaper Hoy
- Social work by Caja de Extremadura
- Social work by Caja de Badajoz

=== 2003 ===
- Monastery of Yuste
- Asociación de Víctimas del Terrorismo
- Florinda Chico, actress
- Luis Pastor, singer-songwriter
- Caja Rural de Almendralejo
- Mérida School of Art

=== 2004 ===
- Diego Hidalgo Schnur, social entrepreneur and philanthropist
- Dulce Chacón, writer (posthumous)
- The people of Madrid, after the 11 March attack
- The people of Talayuela
- Association for the Defense of Nature and Resources of Extremadura (Adenex)
- Extremadura Special Sports Games (JEDES)

=== 2005 ===
- Javier Cercas, writer
- Luis Landero, writer
- Luis Canelo Gutiérrez, painter
- José María Caballero Cáceres, missionary
- Unit of Regional Transplant Coordination
- Red Cross of Extremadura
- El Redoble Cáceres Folklore Association

=== 2006 ===
- José Calderón, NBA basketball player
- José Miguel Santiago Castelo, journalist and director of the Extremadura Royal Academy of Arts and Letters
- Miguel Sansón Serván, artisan
- Concepción Álvarez Sánchez, La Troya restaurant of Trujillo
- Grecolatino Youth Festival

=== 2007 ===
- Helga de Alvear, art collector
- Juan Margallo, actor
- Antonio Ferrera, matador
- ONCE
- El Figón de Eustaquio restaurant of Cáceres
- Azcona restaurant of Badajoz

=== 2008 ===
- Queen Sofía
- Juan Carlos Rodríguez Ibarra, President of the Regional Government of Extremadura
- José Luis Sáez, president of the Spanish Basketball Federation
- Juan Espino Navia, president of the Extremadura Football Federation
- Pureza Canelo, poet
- Francisco Rubio Llorente, president of the Council of State
- Soraya Arnelas, singer
- Committee of Representatives of Persons with Disabilities
- Association for the Assistance to Families Affected by Leukemia
- Congregation Sisters of the Cross
- Caja Rural de Extremadura
- Atrio restaurant of Cáceres

=== 2009 ===
- Pablo Campos Palacín, researcher
- María Ángeles Durán, sociologist and CSIC researcher
- Jesús Sánchez Adalid, writer
- Pepa Bueno, journalist and TVE news presenter
- Fernando Hernández Pelayo, journalist (posthumous)
- Tomás Pérez Durán, journalist
- Miguel Murillo Gómez, dramatist
- María Coronada, soprano
- The people of Barrancos, Portugal, for aiding Extremaduran refugees during the Spanish Civil War
- Observatory of Human Rights of the Badajoz Bar Association

=== 2010 ===
- Felipe, Prince of Asturias
- Juan de Dios Román, president of the Spanish Handball Federation
- Ángeles Luaces, journalist
- Noelia García Martin, Paralympic swimmer
- Víctor Guerrero Cabanillas, physician and writer
- Francisco Valverde Luengo, ex-president of FEAPS Extremadura
- Fray Guillermo Cerrato Chamizo, prior of the Monastery of Santa María de Guadalupe
- Jaime Alejandro Maldonado, brigadier general of the Civil Guard in Extremadura
- Joaquín González Manzanares, founder of the Union of Extremaduran Bibliophiles
- Cooperativas Agroalimentarias de Extremadura

=== 2011 ===
- The people of Zalamea de la Serena, for their annual production of The Mayor of Zalamea
- Manuel Pecellín Lancharro, writer
- Manuel Rui Nabeiro, industrialist
- Mercedes Moreno, volunteer for the integration of inmates
- University of Seniors

=== 2012 ===
- Hermanas Servidoras de Jesús del Cottolengo del Padre Alegre de La Fragonal (Nuñomoral)
- Miguel del Barco Gallego, musician, composer of the Hymn of Extremadura
- Víctor Chamorro, writer
- Miguel de la Quadra-Salcedo, creator of Ruta Quetzal
- Delfín Hernández Hernández, rural physician, dean of the UEX Faculty of Medicine

=== 2013 ===
- Civil Guard
- Tomás Calvo Buezas, anthropologist and sociologist
- Francisco Pedraja Muñoz, painter
- Enrique Floriano, Paralympic swimmer
- Badajoz weekly San Atón

=== 2014 ===
- Adolfo Suárez, President of Spain from 1976 to 1981 (posthumous)
- Robe Iniesta, founder, composer, and singer of rock group Extremoduro
- Asociación Para la Donación de Médula Ósea de Extremadura (ADMO)
- National University of Distance Education (UNED)
- Superior Headquarters of the National Police Corps in Extremadura

=== 2015 ===
- Real Sociedad Económica Extremeña de Amigos del País (RSEEAP), Badajoz
- Elena Ayuso Ledesma, paracanoe athlete
- Talavera la Real Air Base and Spanish Air Force unit Ala 23
- Extremaduran Provincial Councils of the Spanish Association Against Cancer (AECC) and Extremaduran Oncology Association (AOEX)
- Caritas diocesans of Coria-Cáceres, Plasencia, Mérida-Badajoz, and Food Bank of the provinces of Cáceres and Badajoz

=== 2016 ===
- José Luis Pérez Chiscano, naturalist
- Acetre, musical group
- Santa Ana University Center of Almendralejo
- Extremaduran Folklore Federation
- Civil protection volunteers
- The people of Moraleja, for their involvement in the 2015 Sierra de Gata fire

=== 2017 ===
- María Victoria López, director of Medicus Mundi in Extremadura
- Pepe Extremadura, singer-songwriter
- Santa Teresa CD, women's football club
- Orfeón Cacereño
- Colegio San José of Villafranca de los Barros

=== 2018 ===
- María Victoria Gil Álvarez
- Ángel Sastre, journalist
- Sor Cristina de Arana, nun
- Gonzalo Martín Domínguez, teacher and president of the Casa de Extremadura in Seville
- Jaime de Jaraíz, painter and musician (posthumous)
- Manantial folk, musical group
- Extremaduran Federation of Musical Bands

== See also ==
- Orders, decorations, and medals of Spain
