= Sierra de Gata (comarca) =

Coordinates: 40°14′N 6°45′W

- Comarca
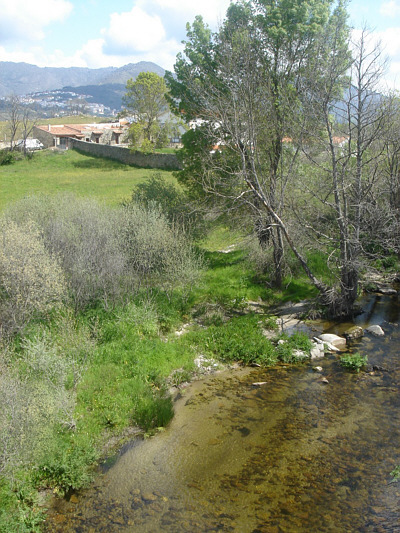
- Landscape of Sierra de Gata near Eljas

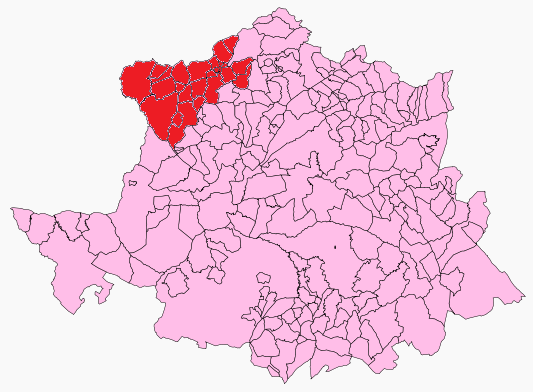
- Location in the province of Cáceres
- Country: Spain
- Autonomous community: Extremadura
- Province: Cáceres
- Municipalities: List: See text

Area
  - Total: 1,254 km^{2} (484 sq mi)

Population
  - Total: 18,500
  - Density: 14.8/km^{2} (38.2/sq mi)
- Time zone: UTC+1 (CET)
  - Summer (DST): UTC+2 (CEST)
- Largest municipality: Valverde del Fresno

Sierra de Gata is a comarca at the northern end of province of Cáceres in Extremadura, one of Spain's seventeen Autonomous Communities. The mountain range of Sierra de Gata is in the area and has given its name to the comarca. The main town is Moraleja.

This comarca borders with Portugal in the west in the area of the Portuguese Serra da Malcata Natural Reserve. There are linguistic affinities between this comarca and neighboring Las Hurdes.

== Municipal terms ==
The traditional names of the towns and aldeas are in brackets.

- Acebo (L'Acebu)
- Cadalso (Cajarsu)
- Cilleros (Cillerus)
  - Parrera
- Descargamaría
- Eljas (As Ellas)
  - El Soto (U Soitu)
- Gata
  - Moheda de Gata (La Mueda)
- Hernán Pérez (Jerranperris)
- Hoyos (Joyus)
- Moraleja
  - Cañadas
  - Malladas
  - La Mata
  - Pedrizas
  - Porciones
  - La Quinta
  - Rozacorderos
- Perales del Puerto (Peralis)
- Robledillo de Gata (Robleillu)
- San Martín de Trevejo (Sa Martín de Trebellu)
- Santibáñez el Alto (Santibañis l'Altu)
- Torre de Don Miguel
- Torrecilla de los Ángeles (Torrecilla de los Ángilis)
- Valverde del Fresno (Valverdi du Fresnu)
- Vegaviana
- Villamiel
  - Trevejo (Treveju)
- Villanueva de la Sierra (Villanueva)
- Villasbuenas de Gata (Villasgüenas)
