= Pureza Canelo =

- Born: December 9, 1946 (age 79); Moraleja, Cáceres, Spain
- Occupations: Poet and cultural ambassador
- Awards: Adonais Prize for Poetry (1970)

Pureza Canelo Gutiérrez (Moraleja, Cáceres, 1946) is a Spanish poet and cultural ambassador. She won the Adonais Prize for Poetry in 1970 for Lugar común.

== Biography ==
Canelo was born on 9 December 1946 in Moraleja, Spain. She has three older siblings. She spent her childhood and adolescence in the rural town of Moraleja, then moved to Madrid to study education.

In 1960, she won the Adonais Prize for her work Lugar común; beginning in 1990, she was part of the jury that awarded it. In 1975, she obtained a creative writing scholarship from the Fundación Juan March.

As a cultural ambassador, she was the boss of the Office of Cultural Activities of the Autonomous University of Madrid and director of the Fundación Gerardo Diego.

Her work has been translated into English and German.

== Works ==
1970. Lugar común. Adonais Prize.

1971. Celda verde.

1974. El barco del agua.

1979. Habitable (primera poética).

1986. Tendido verso: segunda poética.

1990. Pasión inédita.

1995. Moraleja.

1999. No escribir.

2011. A todo lo no amado.

2013. Oeste

2018. Retirada

2019. Habitable. (Antología poética, 1971-2018). José Teruel edition.

2020. Palabra naturaleza. Author's edition.

2022. De traslación.

== Prizes and awards ==
- 1970, Adonáis for Lugar común.
- 1980, Juan Ramón Jiménez del Instituto del Libro Español.
- 1999, Ciudad de Salamanca for No escribir.
- 2008, Medalla de Extremadura.
- 2009, Francisco de Quevedo for Dulce nadie.
