= Enrique Moreno =

Enrique Moreno may refer to:

- Enrique Moreno (attorney) (1955–2019), Mexican-American attorney-at-law
- Enrique Moreno (footballer) (1963–2012), Spanish football defender
- Enrique Moreno González (born 1939), Spanish surgeon
- Enrique Moreno Pérez (1877–1932), Mexican politician and Supreme Court justice
