= María Ángeles Durán =

Spanish scientist and sociologist

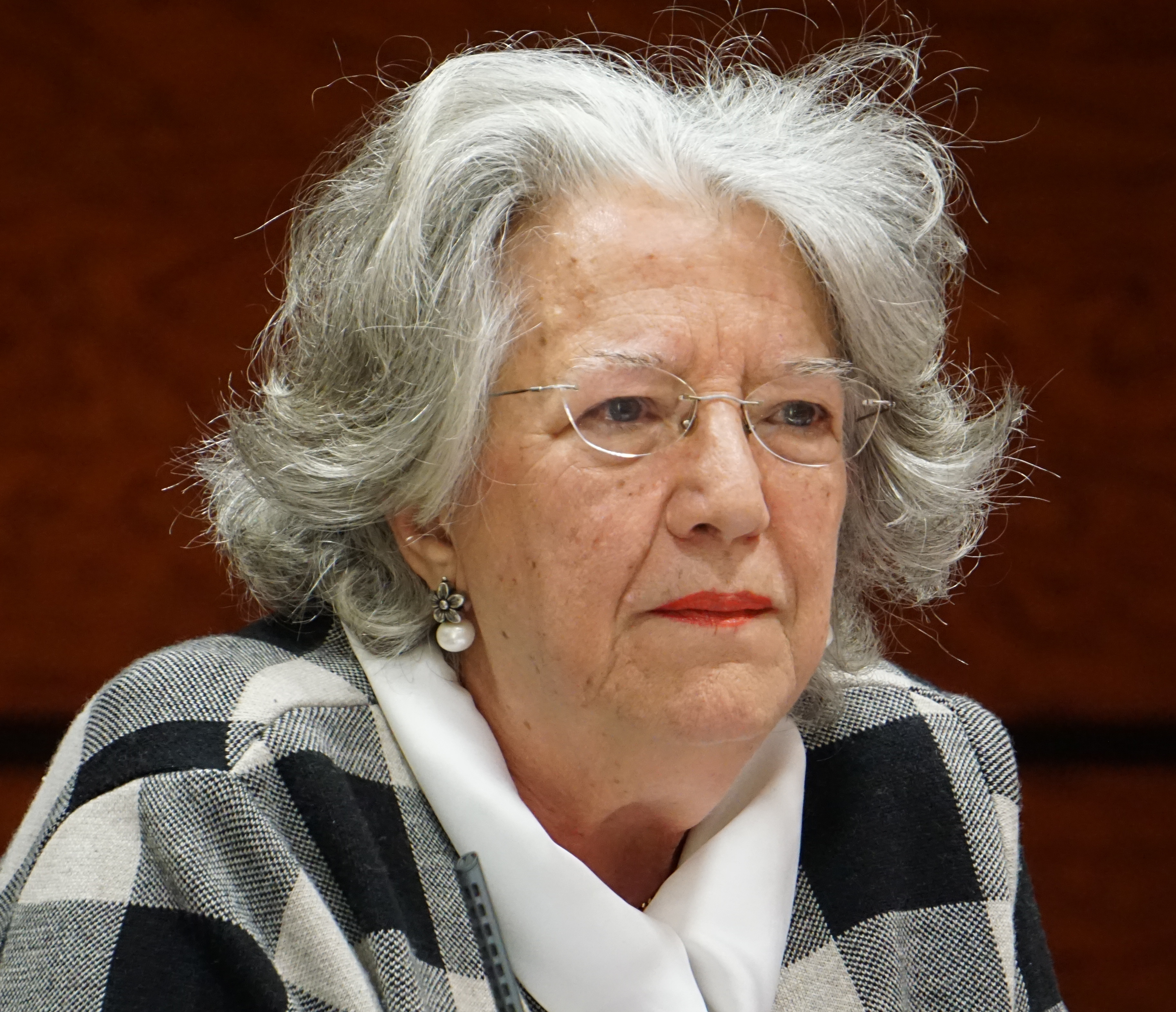
- Born: María Ángeles Durán Heras; 30 November 1942 (age 83); Madrid, Spain
- Education: University of Madrid
- Occupations: Sociologist, university professor, writer
- Employers: Autonomous University of Madrid; Complutense University of Madrid; Spanish National Research Council
- Awards: Pascual Madoz Award (2002); Medal for Merit at Work (2005); Medal of Extremadura (2009)

María Ángeles Durán Heras (born 30 November 1942) is a Spanish sociologist best known for being a pioneer in research on unpaid work, the social situation of women and their social and work environment, health economics, and inequality in the use of time. She was the first woman to attain a chair of sociology in Spain, in 1982. She was one of the first researchers in her field who carried out works with a feminist perspective in the Spanish academic world. In 1979, she was the founder and director of the Women's Studies Seminar of the Autonomous University of Madrid, the first university institute for women's studies created in Spain. In 2002 she received the Pascual Madoz National Research Award in Economic and Legal Sciences. Retired in 2012, she is currently active at the Center for Human and Social Sciences of the Spanish National Research Council (CSIC) as an ad honorem researcher.

== Biography ==
María Ángeles Durán is part of the first Madridian generation of a family from the Extremaduran Sierra de Gata. Her father was an industrial engineer born in the north of Cáceres who had a career in Madrid, and her mother was from La Granja de San Ildefonso. María Ángeles, the oldest of six children, was born and lived in Madrid, although she often returns to Extremadura. The sociologist credits her father's influence for her interest in mathematics and languages. She arrived at the Faculty of Political Sciences at age 16, at a time when university women were the exception. At 18 she was a delegate of her class. She graduated in Political and Economic Sciences in 1964 and earned a Ph.D. in political science from the Complutense University in 1971, with a doctoral thesis entitled El trabajo de las Mujeres (The Work of Women). In 1972, she did postdoctoral studies at the University of Michigan Institute for Social Research on a grant from the Fulbright Program, specializing in the differential socialization of gender and social inequalities.

In 1979 she founded the Women's Study Seminar, forerunner of the Autonomous University of Madrid's University Institute of Women's Studies (IUEM), the first such institute established in Spain, and served as its first director until 1985. She carried out various works investigating the situation of women in the scientific field and the application of gender perspective to research, and in 1981 published Liberación y utopía: la mujer ante la ciencia. In 2001, she was one of the founders of the Association of Women Researchers and Technologists (AMIT).

In 1982 she won the Chair of Sociology, becoming the first woman in Spain to achieve a chair in that specialty.

Durán has been a professor of sociology at the Autonomous and Complutense Universities of Madrid, CEU, and Zaragoza. From 1987 until her retirement in 2012 she took residencies to teach or carry out research at the University of Michigan, University of Rio de Janeiro (1981), University of Cambridge (1988 and 1997), University of Washington, Seattle (1989), and the European Institute of Florence (1997).

She was also Professor of Research in the specialty of Social Sciences at the Spanish National Research Council (CSIC). Currently, she continues to work at the CSIC's Center for Human and Social Sciences as an ad honorem researcher.

From 1998 to 2001, she chaired the Spanish Federation of Sociology, and from 2002 to 2006 she was a member of the executive committee of the International Sociological Association.

In 2009, she was the promoter of the UNESCO Chair UNITWIN Network in Gender Policies and Equality of Rights Between Women and Men, which she headed from 2010 to 2013. In October 2013, she was replaced by IUEM member Virginia Maquieira. Durán is currently the Honorary Chair.

She holds honorary doctorates from the University of Valencia, Autonomous University of Madrid, and University of Granada, and her work has been published in English, French, German, Portuguese, Italian, and Catalan.

== Unpaid work of women ==
Durán is a specialist in analyzing the value of unpaid work in developed economies, and in studying to what extent societies' level of well-being would be sustained without these contributions, often invisible and made by women.

She was a pioneer in making visible the unpaid sector of the Spanish economy that allowed accounting for women's unpaid work. Her research has revealed that Spanish women are those who spend the most time on unpaid work and the least on paid work in Europe. They fall within the scope of economic sociology: the value of unpaid work, the social cost of illness, the global need for care and the perception of the body and space of women, the interdependence between life private and public, as well as the situation of social groups that until the beginning of her work had attracted little interest from sociology and economics.

In the study "La Cuenta satélite", the role of housewives in the economy is analyzed in depth, and it is concluded that this group represents the great engine, not only of the economy, but of the survival of homes. According to calculations of her research, during the first years of the 21st century in Spain, men performed 70% of paid work and women only 30%. But women performed 79% of domestic work, while men only 21%. "Hence, to work, what is said to work, women work more than men," said Durán in 2008. "The average work week of a Spanish male, excluding vacations and holidays, is 36 hours and 43 minutes a week; that of a woman is 56 hours and 7 minutes."

In 2011, she estimated from her research that unpaid work represented around 53% of the Spanish GDP.

"Women, as a whole, bear the responsibility of their children, the sick, and the old, and also give a large part of their resources to the active population of men so that they are more available for their professional careers." Their achievements have been at the cost of "juggling and finding an exceptional partner," Durán explained in 2012.

== Breast cancer survivor ==
In the late 1990s Durán was diagnosed with breast cancer. "I was already working on the use of time, so I marked myself, as a bit of therapy, to make the observation of lost times in the waiting rooms, in the treatments. I turned it into an observation of myself, to take iron and give it a use." In 2003 she published an autobiographical book, Diario de batalla. Mi lucha contra el cáncer, in which she related her experience of six years of struggle to defeat the fear of breast cancer to endure and overcome the disease.

She was one of the founders of AMIT and also a pioneer in investigating the situation of women in the scientific field, and the application of gender perspective to research, publishing Liberación y utopía: la mujer ante la ciencia in 1981. Her autobiographical book Diario de batalla was recognized by the Foundation for Public Education and Oncological Continuing Education (FEFOC) as "a valuable contribution to knowledge and better understanding of the situation of the sick and their emotional environment."

== Personal life ==
María Ángeles Durán married in 1967, at age 24. She has had four children.

== Awards and recognitions ==
- 2002 Pascual Madoz National Research Award in Economic and Legal Sciences
- 2005 Gold Medal for Merit at Work
- 2008 Doctor honoris causa from the Autonomous University of Madrid
- 2009 Medal of Extremadura
- 2010 Culture for Health Award (ADEPS)
- 2012 Doctor honoris causa from the University of Valencia
- 2013 Doctor honoris causa from the University of Granada
- 2016 Award of the Federation of Progressive Women in the National Category

=== María Ángeles Durán Award ===
In 2004 the Autonomous University of Madrid instituted the María Ángeles Durán Award for Scientific Innovation in Women's and Gender Studies, given biannually. Its objectives are to promote the advancement of feminist knowledge, encourage theoretical and methodological creativity, and boost the quality of research to guarantee social change.

== Selected publications ==
- 1981 – Liberación y utopía: la mujer ante la ciencia
- 1988 – De puertas adentro
- 1996 – Mujeres y hombres en la formación de la Teoría Sociológica
- 1998 – La ciudad compartida: conocimiento, afecto y uso
- 2000 – Si Aristóteles levantara la cabeza. Quince ensayos sobre las ciencias y las letras
- 2000 – Nuevos objetivos de igualdad en el siglo XXI: las relaciones entre mujeres y hombres (coord.)
- 2000–2003 – Los costes invisibles de la enfermedad
- 2003 – Diario de Batalla. Mi lucha contra el cáncer
- 2010 – Tiempo de vida y tiempo de trabajo
- 2012 – El trabajo no remunerado en la economía global
