= CD Badajoz =

Spanish football team

Badajoz
- Full name: Club Deportivo Badajoz
- Nicknames: Blanquinegros (White and Black); Lobos (Wolves)
- Founded: 1905
- Ground: Nuevo Vivero, Badajoz, Extremadura, Spain
- Capacity: 14,898
- Owner: Lanuspe S.L.
- President: Nicolás Vallejo-Nágera
- Head coach: Miguel Ángel Ávila
- League: Segunda Federación – Group 4
- 2025–26: Tercera Federación – Group 14, 2nd of 18 (promoted via play-offs)
- Website: www.clubdeportivobadajoz.es
Home colours	Away colours	Third colours

Club Deportivo Badajoz is a Spanish football team based in Badajoz, in the autonomous community of Extremadura. Founded in 1905, it currently plays in Segunda Federación – Group 4, and holds home games at Estadio Nuevo Vivero, with a 15,198-seat capacity.

== History ==
Founded after the merger of two clubs, named Racing and Sport, Badajoz became a competitive club in 1931, when Francisco Fernandes Marquesta donated the team their first ground, named El Vivero. Subsequently, playing most of their history between the third and second divisions, the club achieved a consistent stay in the latter level during the 1990s.

Never quite good enough to reach La Liga, 11 seasons in the second division came to an end in 2003, with relegation to Segunda División B, the new third level created in 1977. In 2006, Badajoz was saved from folding by the president of a junior club from the city, AD Cerro de Reyes, who replaced them in the third level, with Badajoz falling to the fourth.

On 1 July 2012 Badajoz was relegated to division four, due to a €70,000 debt contracted with its players during the 2011–12 season. being later disbanded through a liquidation process.

After the dissolution, the club was refounded by the supporters with the name of Club Deportivo Badajoz 1905. This re-foundation achieved two consecutive promotions, immediately to Tercera División and, at its third attempt, the club finally came back to Segunda División B on 25 June 2017 by beating CD Calahorra in the last round of the promotion play-offs. In 2019–20, the team dispatched SD Amorebieta, UD Las Palmas and La Liga club SD Eibar to make the last 16 of the Copa del Rey for only the second time, before losing 3–2 to Granada CF after extra time.

In 2020–21, the final season of Segunda B, Badajoz topped both of their groups to qualify for the new Primera División RFEF, but lost by one goal to Amorebieta for a place in the second tier in the play-off final.

== Stadium ==
CD Badajoz plays at Estadio Nuevo Vivero, which had a capacity of 15,200, expandable to 30,000. The club previously played at Estadio El Vivero in the east of the city, before moving a few kilometres south of the Guadiana in 1998 to the new facilities; the first match at the new grounds took place on 2 December 1998, in a friendly goalless match with neighbours CF Extremadura.

The stadium hosted two full internationals for the national team. On 8 September 1999 Spain beat Cyprus 8–0 in an UEFA Euro 2000 qualifier; nearly seven years later, on 2 September 2006, the national side defeated Liechtenstein 4–0 in the qualifying stages of Euro 2008.

== Season to season ==
Season	Tier	Division	Place	Copa del Rey
1939–40	3	1ª Reg.	1st	
1940–41	3	3ª	3rd	
1941–42	3	1ª Reg.	1st	
1942–43	3	1ª Reg.	1st	
1943–44	3	3ª	2nd	Fourth round
1944–45	3	3ª	1st	
1945–46	3	3ª	1st	
1946–47	3	3ª	3rd	
1947–48	3	3ª	3rd	Fourth round
1948–49	3	3ª	6th	Third round
1949–50	3	3ª	13th	
1950–51	3	3ª	5th	
1951–52	3	3ª	7th	
1952–53	3	3ª	1st	
1953–54	2	2ª	9th	
1954–55	2	2ª	8th	
1955–56	2	2ª	10th	
1956–57	2	2ª	7th	
1957–58	2	2ª	12th	
1958–59	2	2ª	14th	Round of 32

Season	Tier	Division	Place	Copa del Rey
1959–60	2	2ª	16th	First round
1960–61	3	3ª	3rd	
1961–62	3	3ª	12th	
1962–63	3	3ª	3rd	
1963–64	3	3ª	3rd	
1964–65	3	3ª	1st	
1965–66	2	2ª	16th	
1966–67	3	3ª	1st	
1967–68	2	2ª	13th	
1968–69	3	3ª	6th	
1969–70	3	3ª	4th	Round of 16
1970–71	3	3ª	12th	Second round
1971–72	3	3ª	8th	First round
1972–73	3	3ª	3rd	First round
1973–74	3	3ª	12th	First round
1974–75	3	3ª	9th	First round
1975–76	3	3ª	14th	First round
1976–77	3	3ª	6th	First round
1977–78	3	2ª B	15th	Second round
1978–79	3	2ª B	16th	First round

Season	Tier	Division	Place	Copa del Rey
1979–80	3	2ª B	10th	Third round
1980–81	3	2ª B	6th	Second round
1981–82	3	2ª B	17th	Second round
1982–83	3	2ª B	8th	
1983–84	3	2ª B	4th	
1984–85	3	2ª B	19th	
1985–86	4	3ª	1st	
1986–87	4	3ª	2nd	
1987–88	3	2ª B	2nd	
1988–89	3	2ª B	4th	
1989–90	3	2ª B	6th	
1990–91	3	2ª B	1st	
1991–92	3	2ª B	2nd	
1992–93	2	2ª	11th	
1993–94	2	2ª	11th	
1994–95	2	2ª	14th	
1995–96	2	2ª	6th	

Season	Tier	Division	Place	Copa del Rey
1996–97	2	2ª	6th	
1997–98	2	2ª	6th	
1998–99	2	2ª	14th	
1999–2000	2	2ª	16th	
2000–01	2	2ª	14th	
2001–02	2	2ª	12th	
2002–03	2	2ª	22nd	
2003–04	3	2ª B	4th	
2004–05	3	2ª B	7th	
2005–06	3	2ª B	7th	
2006–07	4	3ª	7th	
2007–08	4	3ª	8th	
2008–09	4	3ª	5th	
2009–10	4	3ª	1st	
2010–11	3	2ª B	15th	Third round
2011–12	3	2ª B	12th	

- 20 seasons in Segunda División
- 18 seasons in Segunda División B
- 32 seasons in Tercera División (26 as third tier, 6 as fourth tier)

=== Team re-founded ===
Season	Tier	Division	Place	Copa del Rey
2012–13	6	1ª Reg.	1st	
2013–14	5	Reg. Pref.	1st	
2014–15	4	3ª	4th	
2015–16	4	3ª	2nd	
2016–17	4	3ª	2nd	
2017–18	3	2ª B	12th	
2018–19	3	2ª B	4th	
2019–20	3	2ª B	3rd	Round of 16
2020–21	3	2ª B	1st	First round
2021–22	3	1ª RFEF	9th	First round
2022–23	3	1ª Fed.	16th	
2023–24	4	2ª Fed.	16th	
2024–25	5	3ª Fed.	5th	
2025–26	5	3ª Fed.	2nd	
2026–27	4	2ª Fed.		TBD

- 2 seasons in Primera Federación/Primera División RFEF
- 4 seasons in Segunda División B
- 2 season in Segunda Federación
- 3 seasons in Tercera División
- 2 seasons in Tercera Federación

== Players ==
=== Current squad ===
As of 1 September 2026.

Note: Flags indicate national team as defined under FIFA eligibility rules; some limited exceptions apply. Players may hold more than one non-FIFA nationality.

No.	Pos.	Nation	Player
1	GK	ESP	Alonso Pérez
2	DF	ESP	Edu López
3	DF	ESP	Jesús Ocaña
4	DF	ESP	Lolo González
5	DF	ESP	Mario Gómez
6	MF	ESP	Julen Aguirre
7	FW	ESP	José Manuel Bermúdez
8	MF	ESP	Jesús Sánchez
9	FW	ESP	Alex Alegría
10	MF	ESP	Jorge Barba
11	FW	ESP	Guille Perero

No.	Pos.	Nation	Player
12	FW	ESP	Borja Domingo
13	GK	ESP	Sergio Tienza
16	MF	ECU	Gustavo Quezada
20	FW	ESP	Nacho Sánchez
21	MF	ESP	Carlos Beitia
22	DF	ESP	Franc Mateu
23	MF	ESP	Ángel Guerrero
24	FW	ESP	Iker Guarrotxena
25	GK	ESP	Iván Morales
30	FW	ESP	Manu Hernández
33	FW	ARG	Aquíles

=== Reserve team ===
Note: Flags indicate national team as defined under FIFA eligibility rules; some limited exceptions apply. Players may hold more than one non-FIFA nationality.

No.	Pos.	Nation	Player
–	–	ESP	–
–	–	ESP	–

No.	Pos.	Nation	Player
–	–	ESP	–
–	–	ESP	–

=== Out on loan ===
Note: Flags indicate national team as defined under FIFA eligibility rules; some limited exceptions apply. Players may hold more than one non-FIFA nationality.

No.	Pos.	Nation	Player
–	–	ESP	– (at – until –)

== Honours ==
- Extremadura Championship
  - Winners (2): 1935–36, 1939–40
  - Runners-up (4): 1925–26, 1928–29, 1932–33, 1934–35

== Achievements ==
- Promotion to Second Division: 1952–53, 1992–93
- Promotion to Second Division B: 1986–87, 1991–92, 2009–10, 2016–17
- Copa Federación de España (Extremadura tournament): 2015–16, 2016–17

== Historical results ==
- Badajoz–Cartagena FC (5–1; 28 June 1992)
- Badajoz–UE Figueres (7–1; 14 February 1993)
- CD Leganés–Badajoz (2–6, 31 October 1993)
- Badajoz–Burgos CF (5–1; 21 November 1993)
- FC Barcelona B–Badajoz (1–5; 20 April 1996)
- Badajoz–Elche CF (5–0; 14 September 1997)
- Badajoz–Sevilla FC (2–0; 22 February 1998)
- Córdoba CF–Badajoz (0–4; 22 April 2000)
- Mérida UD–Badajoz (0–5; 13 December 2009)

== Notable players ==
The following players have either appeared in at least 100 professional games with the club and/or gained international status:

- (Romania) Dãnut Voicilã
- (Argentina) Héctor Bracamonte
- (Argentina) Ezequiel Castillo
- (Argentina) Alejandro Mancuso
- (Argentina) Martín Romagnoli
- (Equatorial Guinea) Sipo
- (Croatia) Ivica Barbarić
- (Paraguay) Carlos Torres
- (Peru) Pablo Zegarra
- (Spain) Adelardo
- (Spain) Adolfo Baines
- (Spain) Óscar de Paula
- (Spain) Eloy
- (Spain) Emilio López
- (Spain) Enrique Galán
- (Spain) Gerardo
- (Spain) Paco Herrera
- (Spain) Xavi Moro
- (Spain) Pedro Munitis
- (Spain) Txutxi
- (Spain) Francisco Villarroya
- (Turkmenistan) Valeri Broshin
- (Ukraine) Gennadiy Perepadenko

== Famous coaches ==
- (Angola) (Portugal) Carlos Alhinho
- (England) Colin Addison
- (Spain) Marco Antonio Boronat
- (Spain) Paco Herrera
- (Spain) Josu Ortuondo
- (Spain) Miguel Ángel Lotina
- (Spain) Antonio Maceda
- (Spain) Adolfo Muñoz
- (Spain) Joaquín Peiró
- (Spain) Manuel Sarabia
- (Spain) Víctor Torres Mestre
- (Spain) Patxi Salinas
- (Spain) Pedro Munitis

== Anthem ==
The music for the club's anthem was composed by Pablo Romero Aradila, and the lyrics were written by Jesús Delgado Valhondo.
