= Parejo =

Parejo (Spanish pronunciation: [paˈɾexo]) is a Spanish surname. Notable people with the surname include:

- Ángeles Parejo (born 1969), former Spanish footballer
- Dani Parejo (born 1989), Spanish footballer
- Enrique Parejo González (born 1930), Colombian politician
- Iván Parejo (1987-2024), Spanish aerobic gymnast
- Jacinta Parejo (1845–1914), First Lady of Venezuela
- Jesús Parejo (born 1981), former Venezuelan track and field athlete
- José Raúl Gutiérrez Parejo (born 1996), Spanish footballer
- Marcial Gómez Parejo (1930-2012), Spanish painter and illustrator
- Martín Parejo Maza (born 1989), Spanish athlete
- Víctor Manuel Cámara Parejo (born 1959), Venezuelan telenovela and cinema actor
- Yonfrez Parejo (born 1986), Venezuelan professional boxer
