= Gata, Extremadura =

Gata
- municipality
- Flag Coat of arms

- Location within Spain
- Coordinates: 40°14′N 6°36′W
- Country: Spain
- Autonomous community: Extremadura
- Province: Cáceres
- Comarca: Sierra de Gata

Area
  - Total: 94.18 km^{2} (36.36 sq mi)
- Elevation: 637 m (2,090 ft)

Population (2025-01-01)
  - Total: 1,335
  - Density: 14.17/km^{2} (36.71/sq mi)
- Time zone: UTC+1 (CET)
  - Summer (DST): UTC+2 (CEST)

Gata is a municipality located in the province of Cáceres, Extremadura, Spain. The Postal Code is 10860.

== Villages ==
- Gata
- Moheda de Gata (La Mueda)

== See also ==
- Sierra de Gata, comarca

== See also ==
- List of municipalities in Cáceres
