= Hoyos =

- municipality
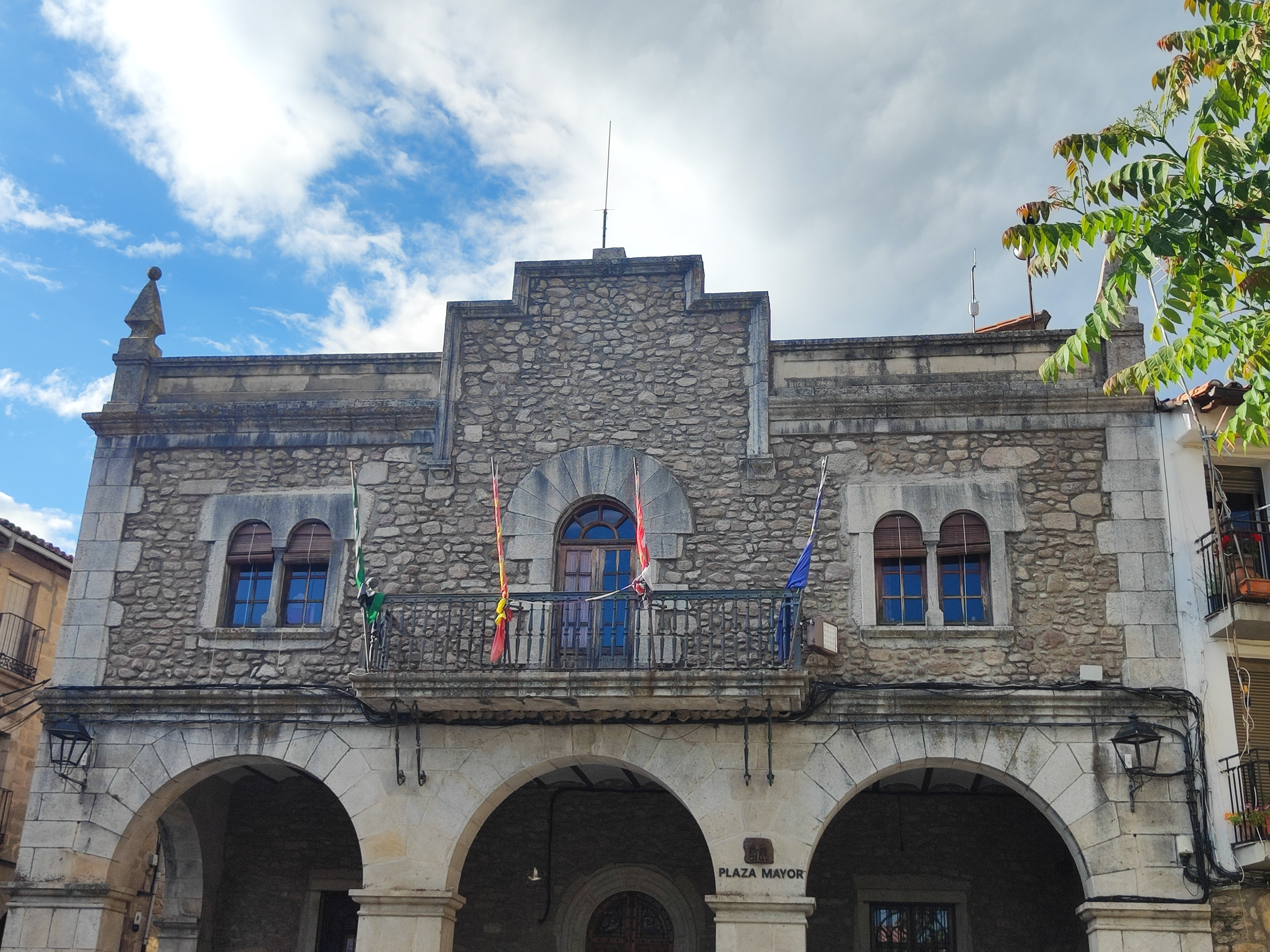
- Town hall

- Coat of arms

- Location within Spain
- Coordinates: 39°42′N 6°21′W
- Country: Spain
- Autonomous community: Extremadura
- Province: Cáceres
- Comarca: Sierra de Gata

Area
  - Total: 15 km^{2} (5.8 sq mi)
- Elevation: 400 m (1,300 ft)

Population (2025-01-01)
  - Total: 848
  - Density: 57/km^{2} (150/sq mi)
- Time zone: UTC+1 (CET)
  - Summer (DST): UTC+2 (CEST)

Hoyos is a municipality located in the province of Cáceres, Extremadura, Spain. According to the 2005 census (INE), the municipality has a population of 988 inhabitants. It is the administrative capital of the Sierra de Gata.

== History ==
It was part of the Dukedom of Alba as the First Duke of Alba, Don García Álvarez de Toledo took possession of the City of Coria together with all its villages, which included Acebo, Hoyos and Perales.

== Church ==
The small church in Hoyos is dedicated to the patron saint of Hoyos, St. Lorenzo (St. Lawrence). During Semana Santa (“Holy Week”) the people of Hoyos process with the figure of the Virgin Mary, at night, through the streets of the city.

== Economy ==
The Regulatory Council of the Denomination of Origin of the Oil "Gata Hurdes" is located in Hoyos, which is also known for its serrano ham, olives (Manzanilla Cacereña variety) and olive oil.

== Tourism ==
Hoyos is a hidden gem in one of Spain's least known tourist destinations. The province of Caceres was the location chosen to film several sequences from the Game of Thrones series. Hoyos itself has a romanesque church and stone houses. In recent years, it has developed a tourism industry thanks to a number of licensed rural hotels such as Jardin de la Sierra de Gata.

== See also ==
- Sierra de Gata, comarca
- Cardinal Hoyos
- Alexander, Count of Hoyos
- House of Hoyos
- Palais Hoyos
- Rodolfo Hoyos, Jr., Mexico City-born American actor
- List of municipalities in Cáceres
