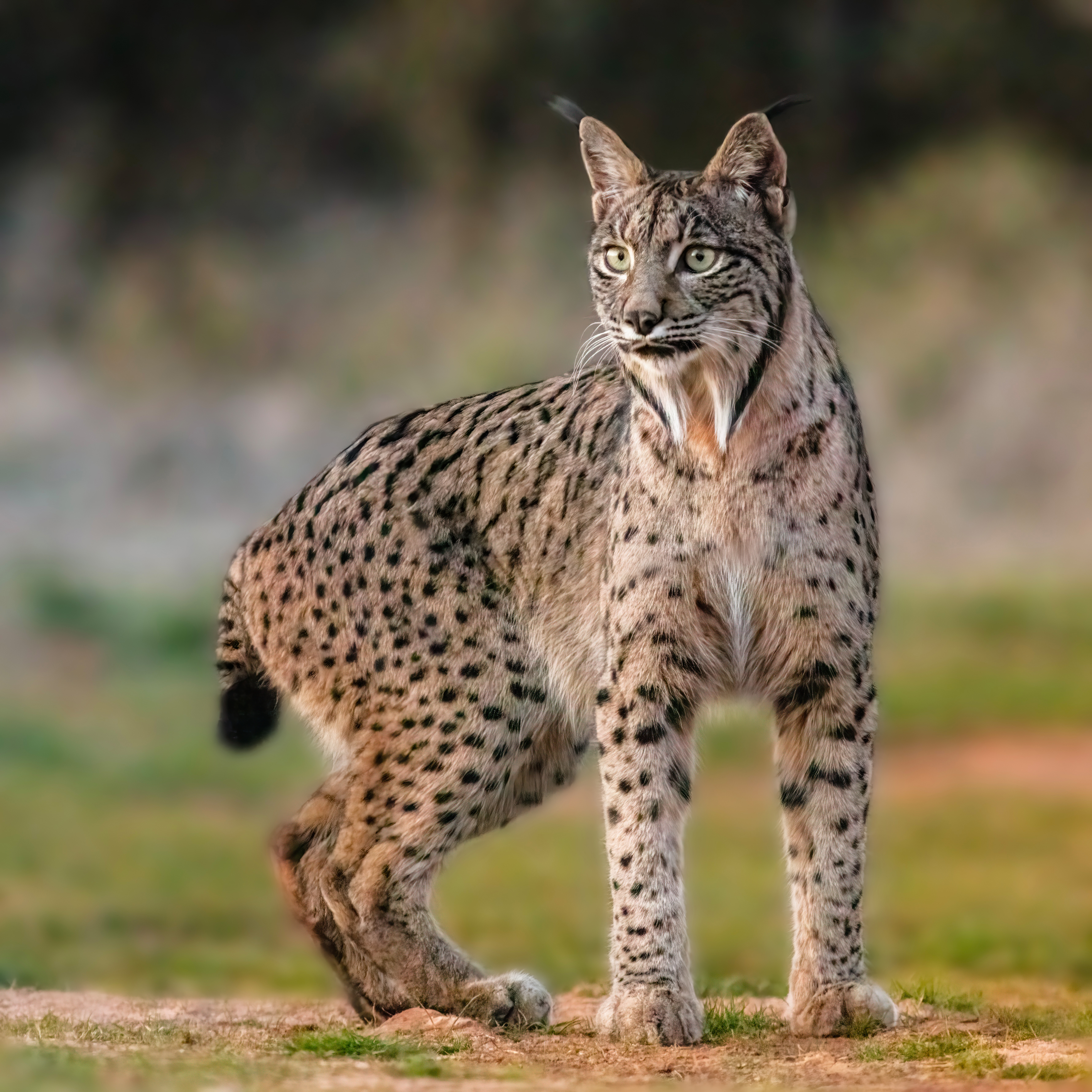
- An Iberian lynx in Almuradiel, Spain

Conservation status
- Vulnerable (IUCN 3.1)
- CITES Appendix I

Scientific classification
- Kingdom: Animalia
- Phylum: Chordata
- Class: Mammalia
- Order: Carnivora
- Family: Felidae
- Genus: Lynx
- Species: L. pardinus

Binomial name
- Lynx pardinus (Temminck, 1827)
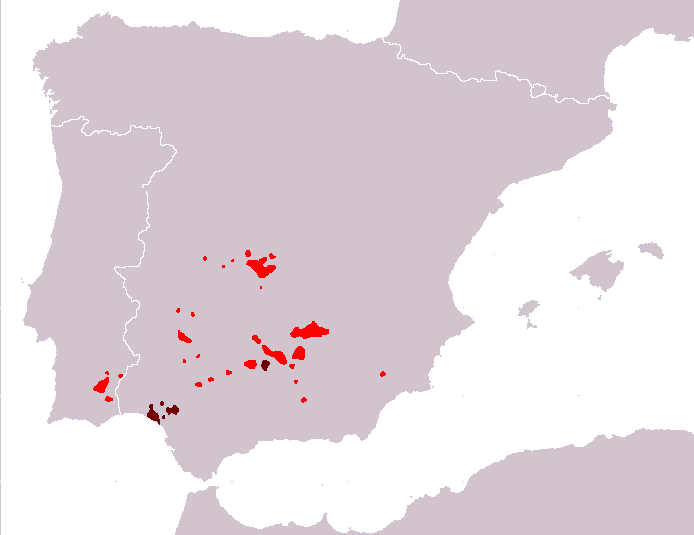
- Iberian lynx distribution (Life Lynxconnect, 2023)

= Iberian lynx =

Iberian lynx Temporal range: Early Pleistocene - Recent 1–0 Ma

Species of mammal

The Iberian lynx (Lynx pardinus) is one of four extant species of Lynx, a genus of medium-sized wild cats. It is endemic to the Iberian Peninsula. Fossils suggest that it has been present in Iberia since the end of the Early Pleistocene around 1 million years ago. It is a monotypic species and is thought to have evolved from Lynx issiodorensis.

The Iberian lynx population declined in the 20th century primarily due to overhunting, poaching, fragmentation of suitable habitats, and the population decline of its main prey species, such as the European rabbit (Oryctolagus cuniculus), caused by myxomatosis and rabbit haemorrhagic disease. By the turn of the 21st century, the Iberian lynx was on the verge of extinction, as only 94 individuals survived in two isolated subpopulations in Andalusia in 2002. Since then, conservation measures have been implemented, which included improving habitat, restocking of rabbits, translocating, reintroducing, and monitoring Iberian lynxes. Between 2012 and 2024, the population had increased from a low of 326 individuals to some 2,021, leading to its reclassification as vulnerable on the IUCN Red List.

== Taxonomy ==
Felis pardina was the scientific name proposed by Coenraad Jacob Temminck in 1827 who described skins of Iberian lynxes that were killed in the area of the Tagus river in Portugal and were traded in Paris and London. It is a monotypic species.

=== Phylogeny ===
The Iberian lynx is suggested to have evolved from Lynx issiodorensis. Its earliest known fossil remains date to the end of the Early Pleistocene, around one million years ago.

The Iberian lynx genetically diverged as a unique species 1.98 to 0.7 million years ago. Its closest living relative is the Eurasian lynx (Lynx lynx) with which it coexisted until the 20th century.

== Characteristics ==
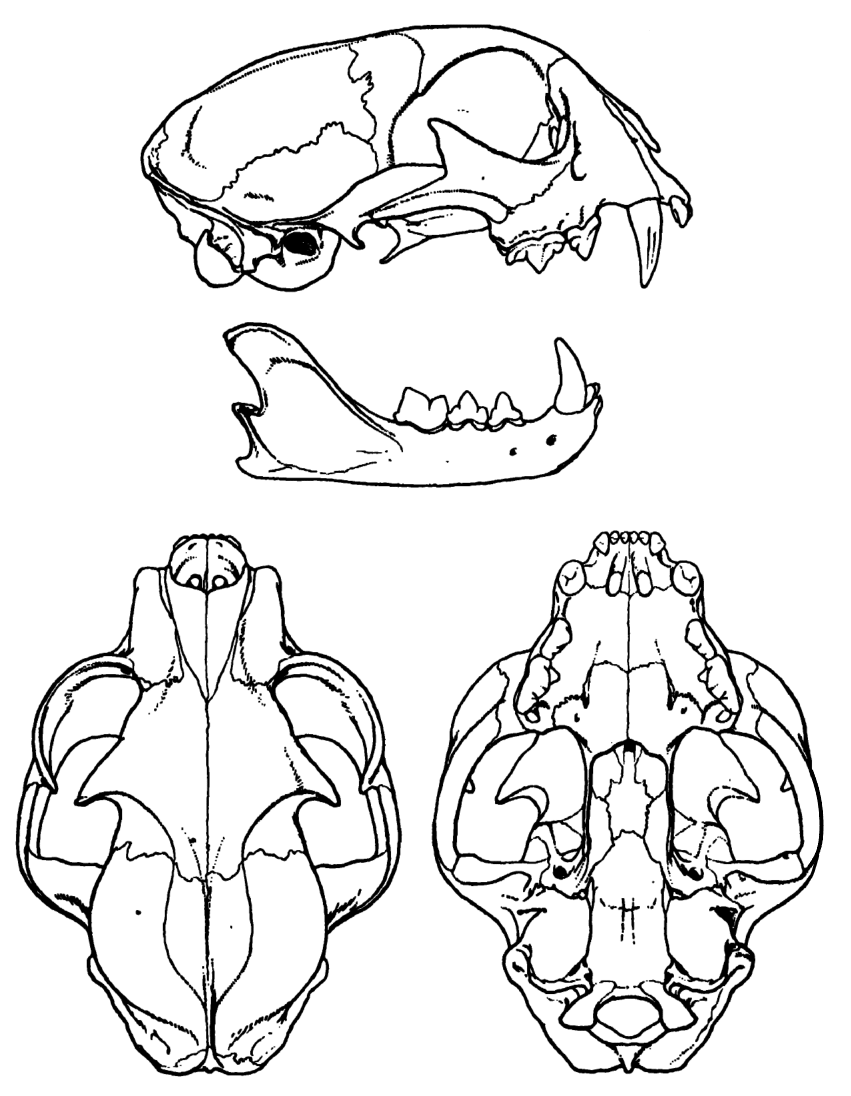
Skull

The Iberian lynx has a short, bright yellowish to tawny coloured spotted fur. The spots vary in shape and size from small round to elongate. They are arranged in lines and decrease in size from the back toward the sides. There are two basic coat-pattern variations: one with many, very small brown to blackish spots in Sierra Morena, and the other with less, but larger spots that form dotted lines in Doñana.

Its head is small with tufted ears and a ruff. Its body is short with long legs and a short tail. Head and body length of males is 74.7–82 cm (29.4–32.3 in) with a 12.5–16 cm (4.9–6.3 in) long tail and a weight of 7–15.9 kg (15–35 lb). Females are smaller with a head-to-body-length of approximately 68.2–77.5 cm (26.9–30.5 in) and a weight of 9.2–10 kg (20–22 lb).

The Iberian lynx with white fur has been recorded twice in total. On 22 October 2025, a white Iberian lynx was photographed for the first time in Jaén, Spain.

== Distribution and habitat ==
The Iberian lynx was once present throughout the Iberian Peninsula. In the 1950s, the northern population extended from the Mediterranean to Galicia and parts of northern Portugal, and the southern population from central to southern Spain. Populations declined from 15 subpopulations in the 1940s to only two subpopulations in the early 1990s, most noticeably in Montes de Toledo and Sierra Morena. Before 1973, it was present in Sierra de Gata, Montes de Toledo, eastern Sierra Morena, Sierra de Relumbrar and coastal plains in the Doñana area. Between the early 1960s and 2000, it has lost about 80% of its former range. In 2012, it was restricted to very limited areas in southern Spain, with breeding only confirmed in Sierra Morena and Doñana coastal plains. As of 2014, its range included the Sierra Morena and Montes de Toledo of Castilla–La Mancha and the Matachel Valley of Extremadura in Spain, and the Guadiana Valley in Portugal. Stable and viable populations have established themselves had increased to 856 individuals by the end of 2019. As of 2024, 2,401 individuals were counted, including 2,047 in Spain and 354 in Portugal. The distribution area has expanded, with breeding individuals in the northern and central parts of Extremadura in Valdecañas and Cornalvo Nature Park, and the Albacete region in Castilla–La Mancha, the Sierras Subbéticas in Andalusia; an introduction project has been launched in the autonomous region of Murcia.

Fossil remains indicate that the Iberian lynx had a wider range during the Late Pleistocene and early Holocene. Five lynx remains found in Arene Candide in Northern Italy date to about 24,820–18,620 years before present. One specimen found in Cabias cave in southern France was radiocarbon dated to 3780±90 years before present. In 2021, a large concentration of Iberian lynxes dating to 40,000 years ago were found for the first time in southern Italy at the archaeological site of Ingarano in Apulia.

== Behaviour and ecology ==
The Iberian lynx marks its territory with its urine, scratch marks on the barks of trees, and scat. The home ranges of adults are stable over many years. Camera trapping surveys in the eastern Sierra Morena Mountains between 1999 and 2008 revealed that six females had home ranges of 5.2–6.6 km^{2} (2.0–2.5 sq mi). Four males in the area had home ranges of 11.8–12.2 km^{2} (4.6–4.7 sq mi).

=== Diet and hunting ===
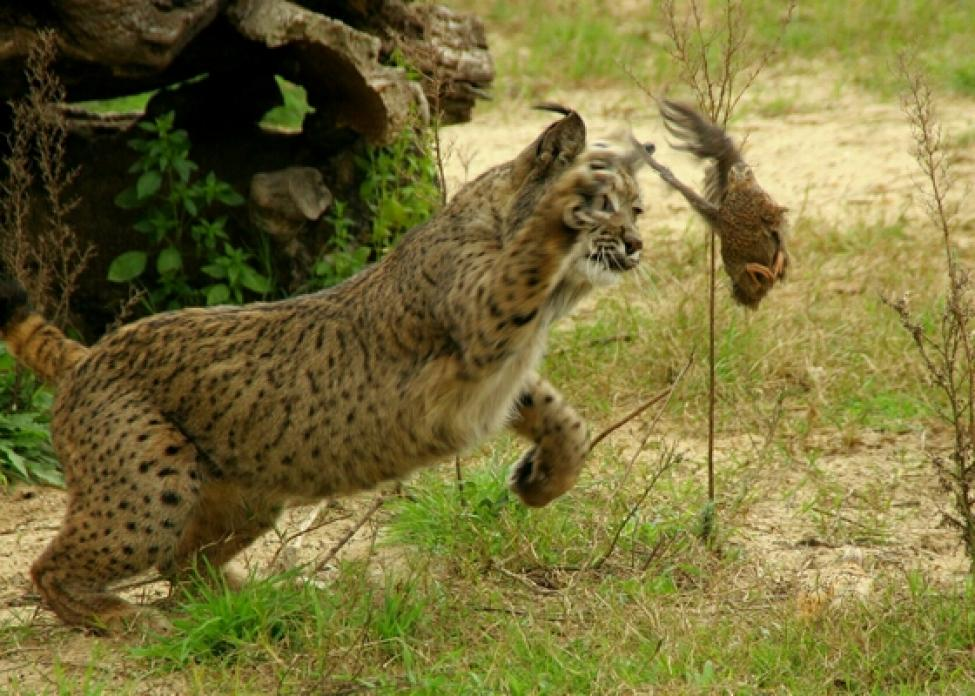
Iberian lynx catching bird

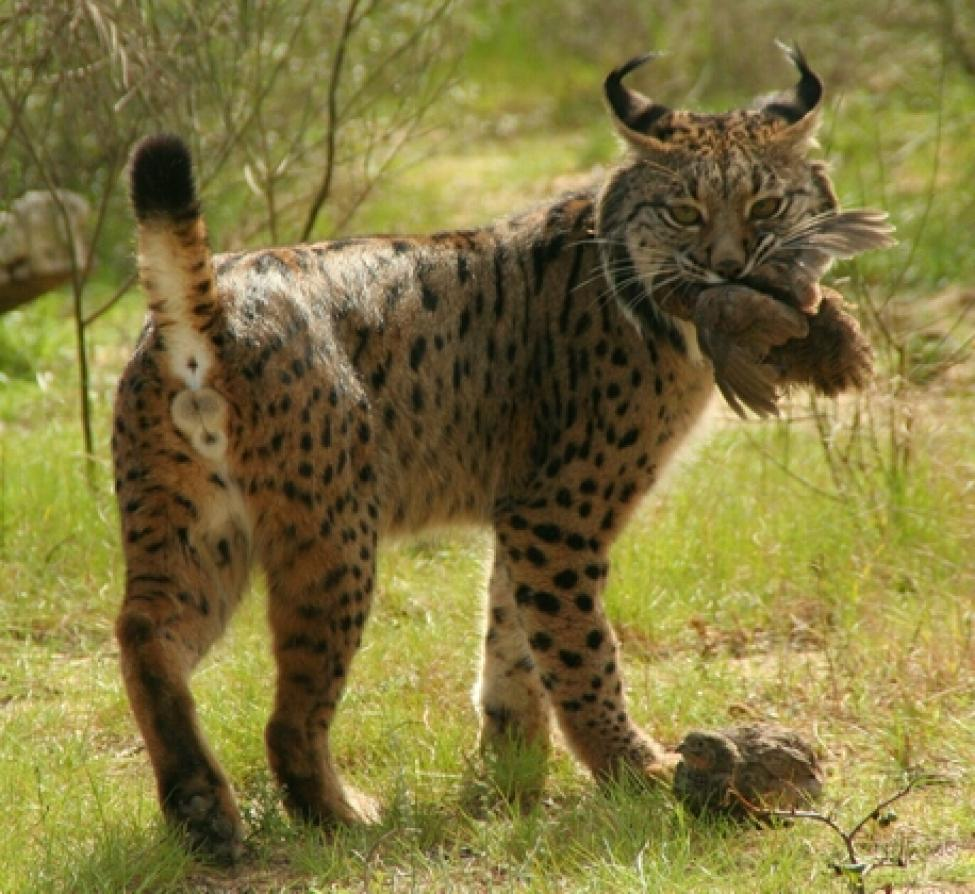
Iberian lynx with bird

The Iberian lynx preys foremost on the European rabbit (Oryctolagus cuniculus) for the bulk of its diet, supplemented by red-legged partridge (Alectoris rufa), rodents and, to a smaller degree, also on wild ungulates. It sometimes preys on young fallow deer (Dama dama), European roe deer (Capreolus capreolus), European mouflon (Ovis aries musimon), and ducks. A male requires one rabbit per day, while a female raising kittens eats three per day.

The Iberian lynx has low adaptability and continued to rely heavily on rabbits, which account for 75% of its food intake, despite the latter's repeated population crashes due to myxomatosis and rabbit haemorrhagic disease. Faecal samples of Iberian lynx contained anaerobic bacteria of the genus Anaeroplasma that suggest gut microbiome helps it digest its rabbit prey and may also aid in the degradation of plant material from the rabbits' guts. Antibiotic resistant bacteria were also found within the digestive tract of wild Iberian lynx.

The Iberian lynx competes for prey with the Iberian wolf (Canis lupus signatus), red fox (Vulpes vulpes), the Egyptian mongoose (Herpestes ichneumon), and the European wildcat (Felis silvestris). Also, it often kills other smaller carnivores such as the aforementioned red fox, Egyptian mongoose and common genet (Genetta genetta). Fossil leporid accumulations from the Late Pleistocene show that Iberian lynxes in Spain retreated to caves to rest and consume their meals.

=== Reproduction ===
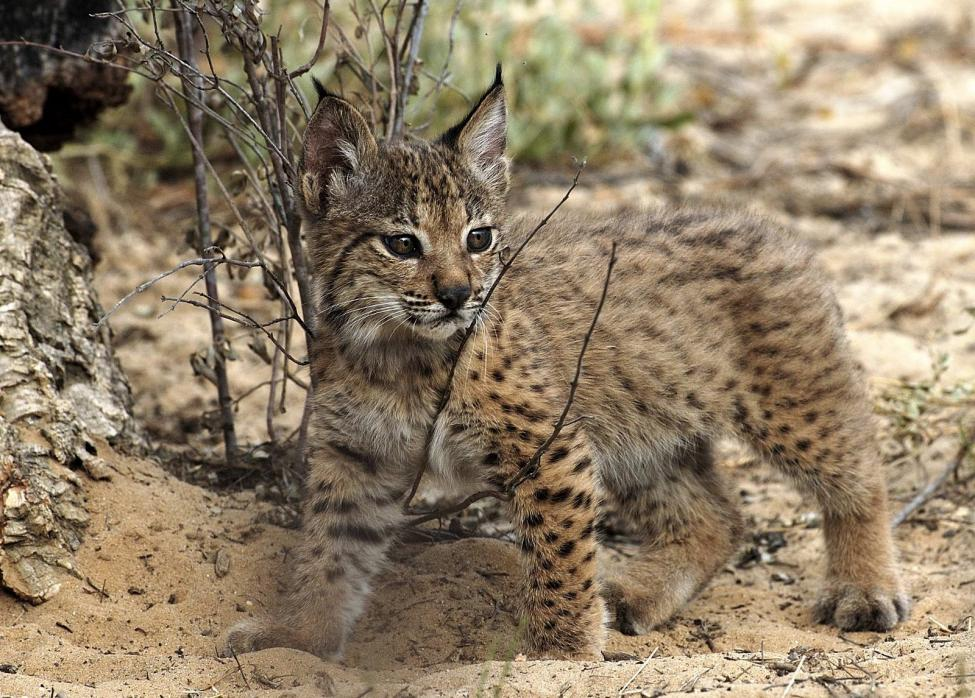
Iberian lynx juvenile

The kittens become independent at 7 to 10 months old, but remain with the mother until around 20 months old. Survival of the young depends heavily on the availability of prey species. In the wild, both males and females reach sexual maturity at the age of one year, though in practice they rarely breed until a territory becomes vacant; one female was known not to breed until five years old when her mother died. The maximum longevity in the wild is 13 years.

Difficulty in finding mates has led to more inbreeding, which results in fewer kittens and a greater rate of non-traumatic death. Inbreeding leads to lower semen quality and greater rates of infertility in males, hindering efforts to increase the species' fitness.

== Threats ==
The Iberian lynx is threatened by habitat loss, road accidents, and illegal hunting. Habitat loss is due mainly to infrastructure improvement, urban and resort development and tree mono cultivation, which fragments the lynx's distribution. In the 20th century, rabbit diseases such as myxomatosis and haemorrhagic disease resulted in a dramatic decline of its main prey. Further, the lynx was hunted as "vermin" under a law passed under Francisco Franco, from the 1950s to the late 1970s, when the hunting of lynx was prohibited. Secret hunting of lynxes still occurs today and is becoming a serious problem. Illegal traps set for rabbits and foxes were the leading causes for lynx mortality in the 1990s. In addition, every year, several Iberian lynxes die when trying to cross highways with heavy traffic, representing the majority of lynx deaths. In 2013, 14 Iberian lynxes died on roads, and 21 in 2014. In 2023, 144 lynxes were killed on roads.

In 2007, several individuals died of feline leukemia.

Increasing interactions with humans and spread of antibiotic resistant genes between lynx populations could pose a significant threat not only to lynx but also to humans.

== Conservation ==
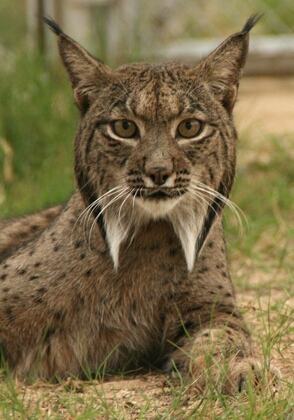
Iberian lynx

The Iberian lynx is fully protected and listed on CITES Appendix I, on Appendix II of the Berne Convention on the Conservation of European Wildlife and Natural Habitats and on Annexes II and IV of the Habitats Directive of the European Union. Since 2024, it is listed as Vulnerable on the IUCN Red List, as the population has increased to more than 2,000 mature individuals. It was the most endangered cat species in the world, but conservation efforts have changed its status from critical to endangered to vulnerable. The loss of the species would have been the first feline extinction since the Smilodon 10,000 years ago.

Conservation measures include restoring its native habitat, maintaining the wild rabbit population, reducing unnatural causes of death, and releasing captive bred individuals. The Spanish National Commission for the Protection of Nature endorsed the Iberian Lynx Ex Situ Conservation Breeding Program to serve as a "safety net" by managing the captive population and also to "help establish new Iberian lynx free-ranging populations through reintroduction programmes." Before release of captive-bred cats, their natural habit may be simulated to prepare them for life in the wild. A 2006 study used a non-intrusive monitoring system involving cameras to monitor the demographics of both lynxes and rabbits residing in Sierra Morena. Supplemental food sources could be provided if wild rabbits suffered a decline.

Management efforts have been developed to conserve and restore the animal's native range. Officials intending to release captive-bred lynx look for areas of appropriate habitat, rabbit abundance, and acceptance by the local human population. About 90 million euros were spent on various conservation measures between 1994 and 2013. The European Union contributes up to 61% of funding.

=== Reintroduction programme ===
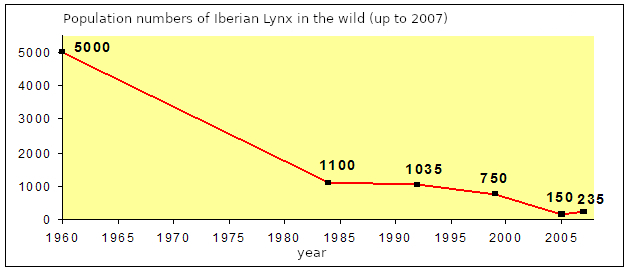
Graph showing Iberian lynx population in Spain, 1960–2007

Beginning in 2009, the Iberian lynx was reintroduced into Guadalmellato, resulting in a population of 23 in 2013. Since 2010, the species has also been released in Guarrizas. Discussions were held with the Ministry of Environment on plans for releases in the Campanarios de Azaba area near Salamanca. In April 2013, it was reported that Andalusia's total wild population—only 94 in 2002—had tripled to 309 individuals. In July 2013, environmental groups confirmed the presence of a wild-born litter in the Province of Cáceres (Extremadura). A study published in July 2013 in Nature Climate Change advised that reintroduction programs take place in northern Iberia, suggesting that climate change would threaten rabbits in the south.

In November 2014, three Iberian lynxes were released in the Montes de Toledo; one of them later travelled near Aranjuez, in the Madrid region, the first time in 40 years.

The presence of Iberian lynxes in Portugal, particularly in the south, has been verified. In 2014, the Institute for Nature Conservation and Forests signed contracts securing 2,000 hectares of land for Portugal's reintroduction project. In 2015, 10 captive-bred Iberian lynxes were released into Guadiana Valley Natural Park and surrounding areas in southeastern Portugal's Guadiana Valley. By the end of 2015, there were 400 lynx on the Iberian peninsula, the vast majority in Andalusia, in southern Spain, but with smaller new populations in the hills near Toledo, in Extremadura (south-western Spain) and in southern Portugal.

The reintroduction of Iberian lynx in Portugal has been a success; from 17 animals that were reintroduced, 12 have already established territories.

Since a 2007 outbreak of feline leukemia virus (FeLV), wild lynxes are tested periodically for possible disease. September–December 2013 samples were negative for FeLV but one male became the first of his species to test positive for feline immunodeficiency virus (FIV) and was placed into quarantine.

=== Captive breeding ===
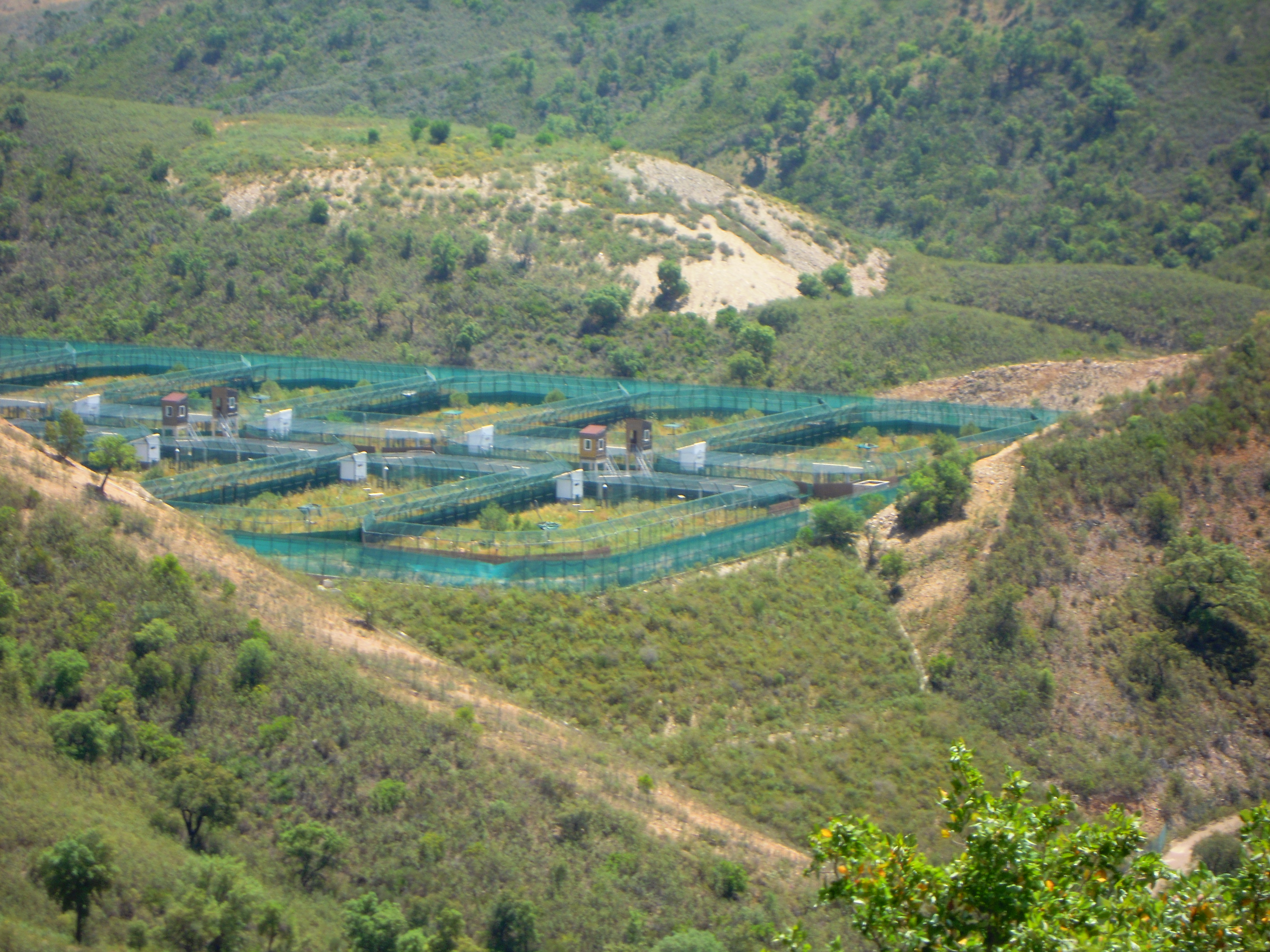
The Iberian Lynx CNRLI reproduction centre near Silves, Portugal

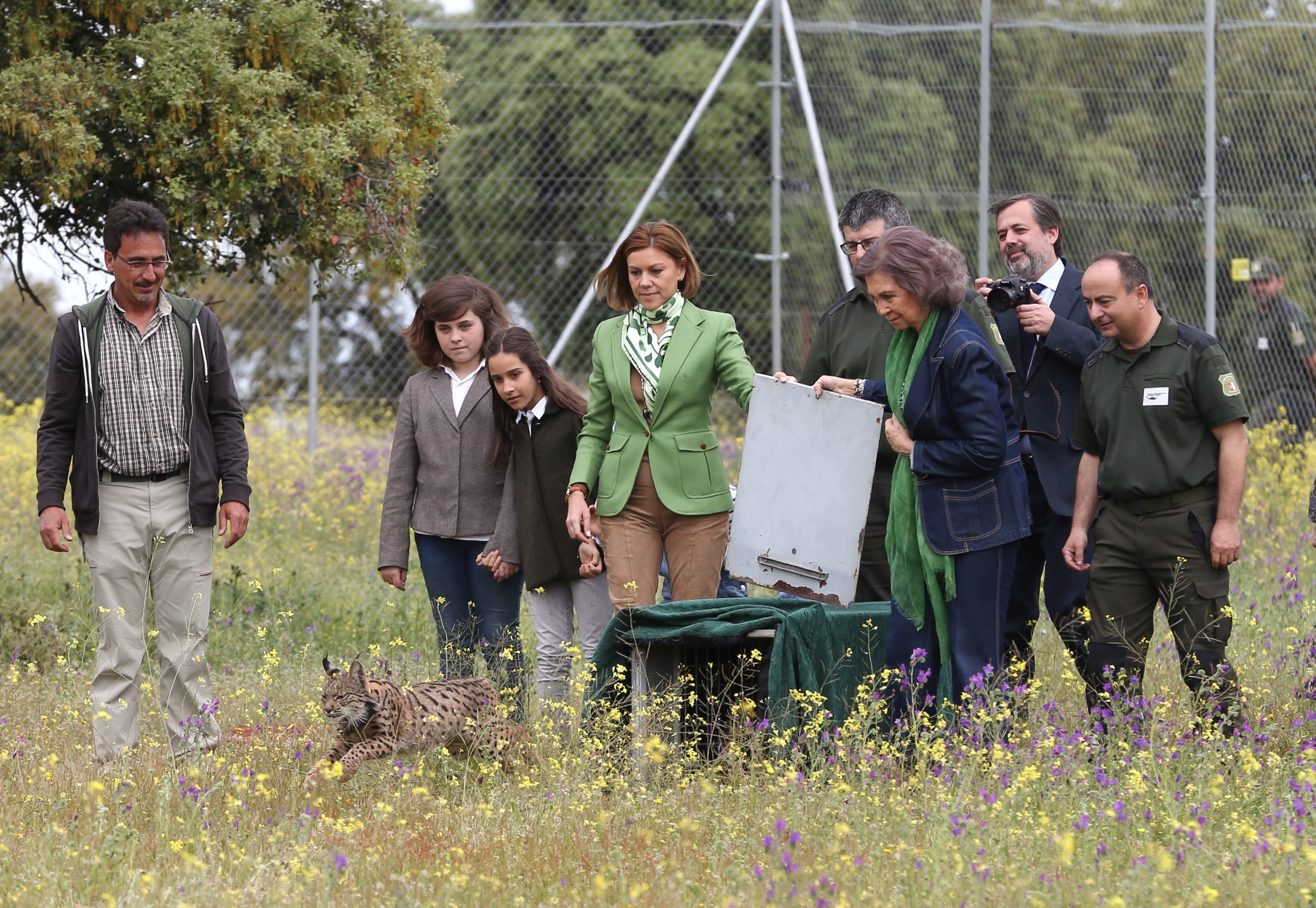
Queen Sofía of Spain and María Dolores de Cospedal release an Iberian lynx at "El Castañar", the finca of the Duke of Pastrana in Mazarambroz, Spain

In 2002, the Jerez Zoo confirmed it had three females and was developing a plan for a captive breeding program. One of those females was Saliega, captured as a kitten in April 2002. She became the first Iberian lynx to breed in captivity, giving birth to three healthy kittens on 29 March 2005 at the El Acebuche Breeding Centre, in the Doñana National Park in Huelva, Spain. In the following years, the number of births grew and additional breeding centres were opened. In March 2009, it was reported that 27 kittens had been born since the beginning of the program. In 2009, the Spanish government planned to build a €5.5 million breeding centre in Zarza de Granadilla.

In Portugal, the Centro Nacional de Reprodução do Lince-Ibérico established a breeding centre near Silves, Portugal, and has since nurtured 122 individuals all born in the breeding centre, of which 89 survived. 73 of them were reintroduced in the wild. Reintroduction takes place in Mértola and Serpa in the Guadiana Valley. As of 2020, there are around 140 individuals in the wild in Portugal spread through an area of approximately 50,000 hectares, 50 of them are juveniles.

There were 14 surviving kittens in 2008 and 15 in 2009. In 2010, intense rain and health issues resulted in lower reproductive success, i.e. 14 born, eight surviving. But the next year, breeding centres recorded 45 births with 26 surviving kittens. In 2012, breeding centres in Portugal and Spain reported a total of 44 survivors from 59 births, while 2013 saw a total of 44 survivors out of 53 born. In 2017, the total population of Iberian lynx reached 475 specimens. In February 2019, the total population was estimated to grow to around 650 individuals.

In March 2013, it was reported that Iberian lynx embryos and oocytes had been collected and preserved for the first time. They were collected from Saliega and another female—both sterilised and retired from the breeding program—by Berlin's Leibniz Institute for Zoo and Wildlife Research and stored in liquid nitrogen at the Museo Nacional de Ciencias Naturales (MNCN) in Madrid for possible future breeding. In July 2014, the MNCN-CSIC announced they had produced sperm cells from the testicular tissue of sexually immature lynx.

Iberian lynxes are kept at Jerez Zoo, at Lisbon Zoo since December 2014, and since July 2016 at the Madrid Zoo.

== Genetic research ==
The genetic diversity of the Iberian lynx is lower than in any other genetically impoverished felid, which is a consequence of fragmentation, a population bottleneck, and isolation of population units. Iberian lynxes in Doñana and Andujar differ genetically at microsatellite markers. Samples collected in Doñana exhibited a high degree of inbreeding as this unit was isolated for a long time.

== In popular culture ==
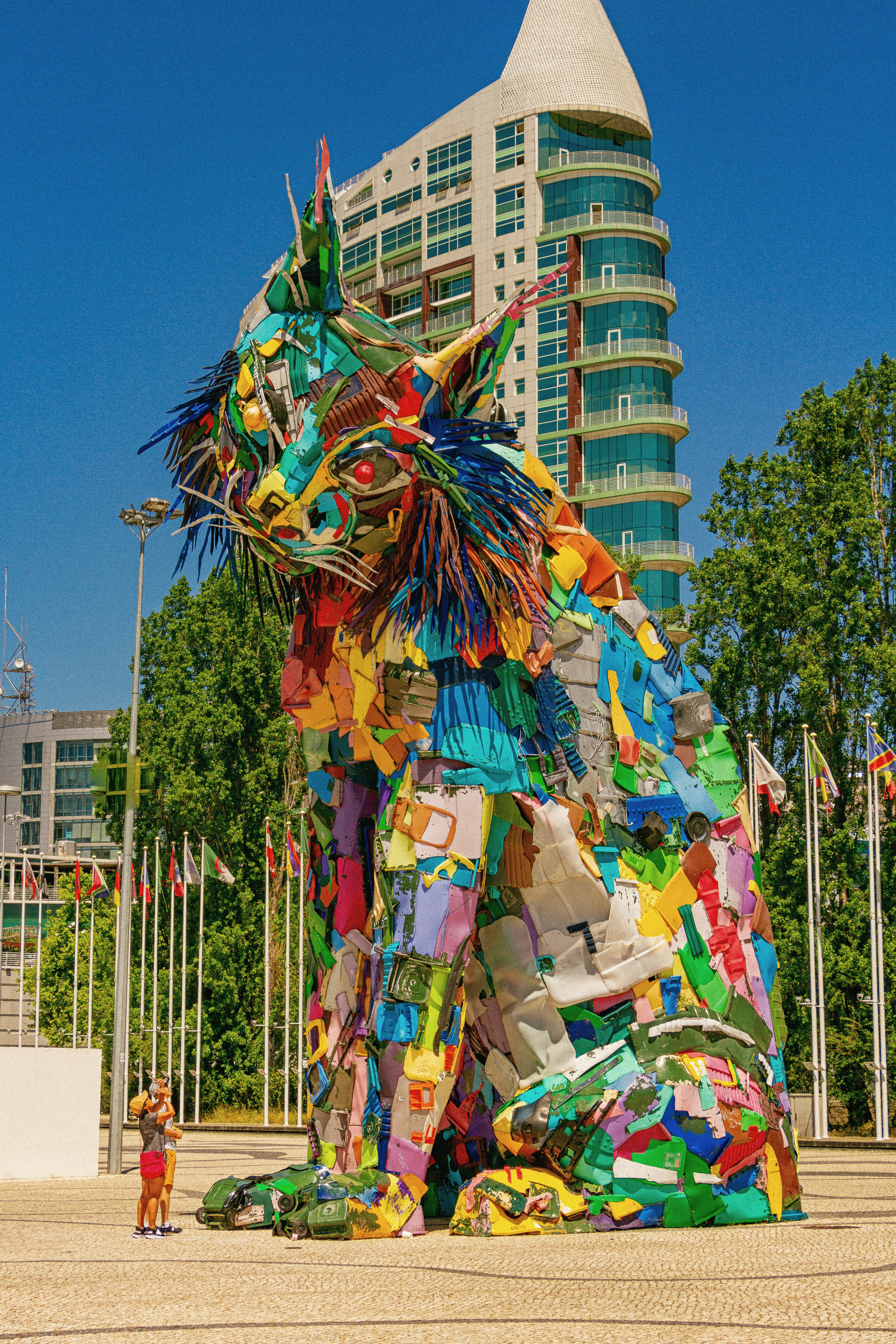
Iberian lynx, Parque das Nações, Lisbon

Portuguese street artist Bordalo II, known for his installations made of garbage, created a public sculpture of an Iberian lynx in Parque das Nações, Lisbon, made for the World Conference of Ministers Responsible for Youth in 2019 and Youth Forum Lisboa+21.

== See also ==
- Bobcat
- Canada lynx
- Felicola isidoroi
