= Marcial Gómez Parejo =

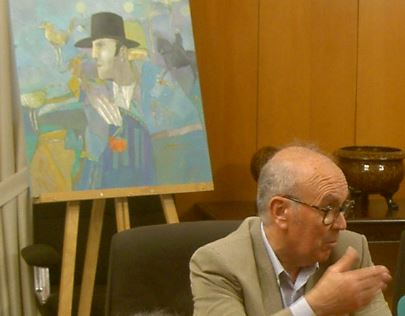
- Marcial Gómez Parejo in 2003
- Born: July 5, 1930; Hinojosa del Duque, Valle de los Pedroches, Córdoba, España
- Died: June 1, 2012 (aged 81); Córdoba
- Known for: Painting, Drawing
- Movement: Magic realism, Surrealism
- Spouse: Rosa Losada

Marcial Gómez Parejo (Hinojosa del Duque, Province of Córdoba, Spain, 5 July 1930 - Córdoba, 1 June 2012) was an Andalusian painter and illustrator known for his imaginative work and magical realism

In his artistics beginnings, between 1949 and 1953, he was influenced by the American comic artist Alex Raymond, creator of Flash Gordon. The panel, he said, began his connection with artistic expression.

In the 1960s he began working for the textile industry in Barcelona, where he created series of gouache with influences of geometric constructivism, with plant motifs and other ornamental arts of Northern Europe and the Soviet Union, places he visited in this decade.

From the 1970s left the world of stamping and started a figurative oil painting with surrealist infiltrations in dialogue with a type of very personal magic realism and began to exhibit at various galleries.

== Awards and exhibitions ==
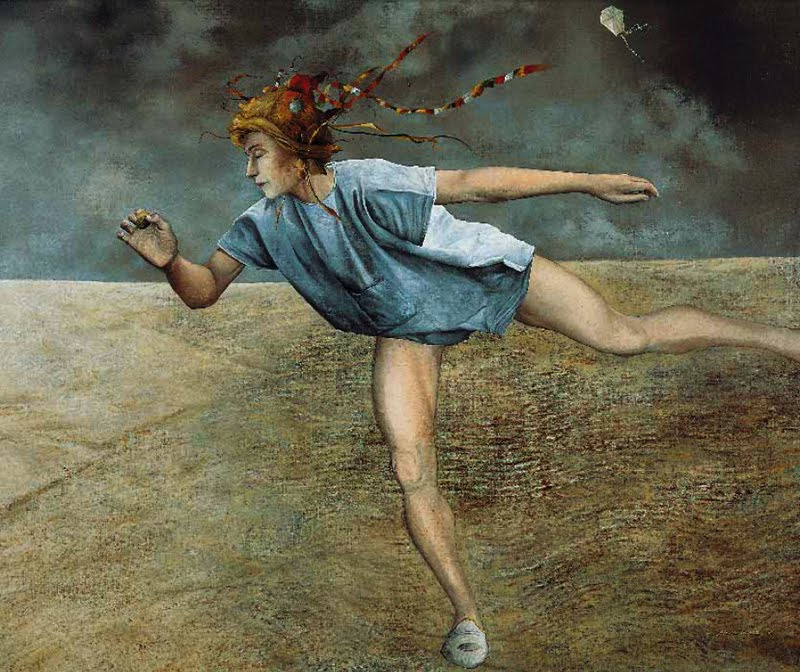
El visionario (The visionary) Oil/wood 150x110 cm (1983)

List of Marcial Gómez Parejo awards and exhibitions:

- 1969: Barcelona, First Prize, I Drawing Textile Award of Spain
- 1971: Barcelona, Second prize III Drawing Textile award of Spain
- 1978: Haurie Gallery, Sevilla, Spain.
- 1978: El nuevo realismo y la escuela sevillana (The new realism and the Seville school) at Heller Gallery, Madrid, Spain. (group exhibition)
- 1979: Tribute to Bosco in the Majke Hüsstege Gallery, 's-Hertogenbosch, Netherlands. (group exhibition)
- 1980: Heller Gallery, Madrid, Spain.
- 1980: Lieve-Hemel Gallery, Amsterdam, Netherlands. (group exhibition)
- 1986: ARCO (Feria Internacional de Arte Contemporaneo), Madrid and Illcenacolo Gallery, Piacenza, Italia. (group exhibition)
- 1987 i 1992: Rayuela Gallery, Madrid, Spain.
- 1988: Medal of Honor for finalist in the "Painters for 1992" Award, Caja Provincial de Córdoba, for the work Interior en ocres (Interior ocher).
- 1989: Nolde Galery, Navacerrada, Spain.
- 1998: Cajasur de Córdoba showroom, Córdoba, Andalusia, Spain.
- 2004: Retrospective exhibition at Palacio de la Merced of Fundación de Artes Plásticas Rafael Botí, Córdoba.
- 2011: Magischer Realismus aus Spanien. Im Schatten der Träume (In the shadow of dreams. Magic Realism in Spain) in the Panorama Museum, Bad Frankenhausen, Germany. (group exhibition with Luis Sáez, José Hernández, Eduardo Naranjo, Vicente Arnas, José Veiés i Dino Valls)

== Gallery ==
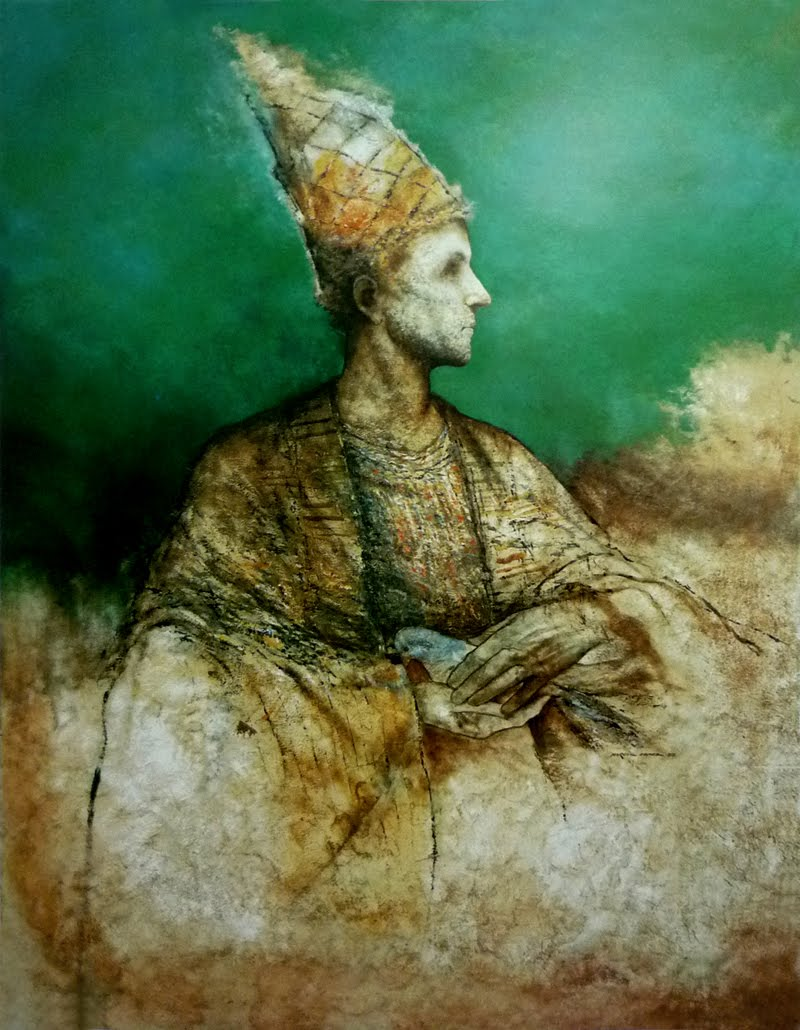
A Silvio de Narni (series Bomarzo) Oil/canvas 130x97 cm (1990)

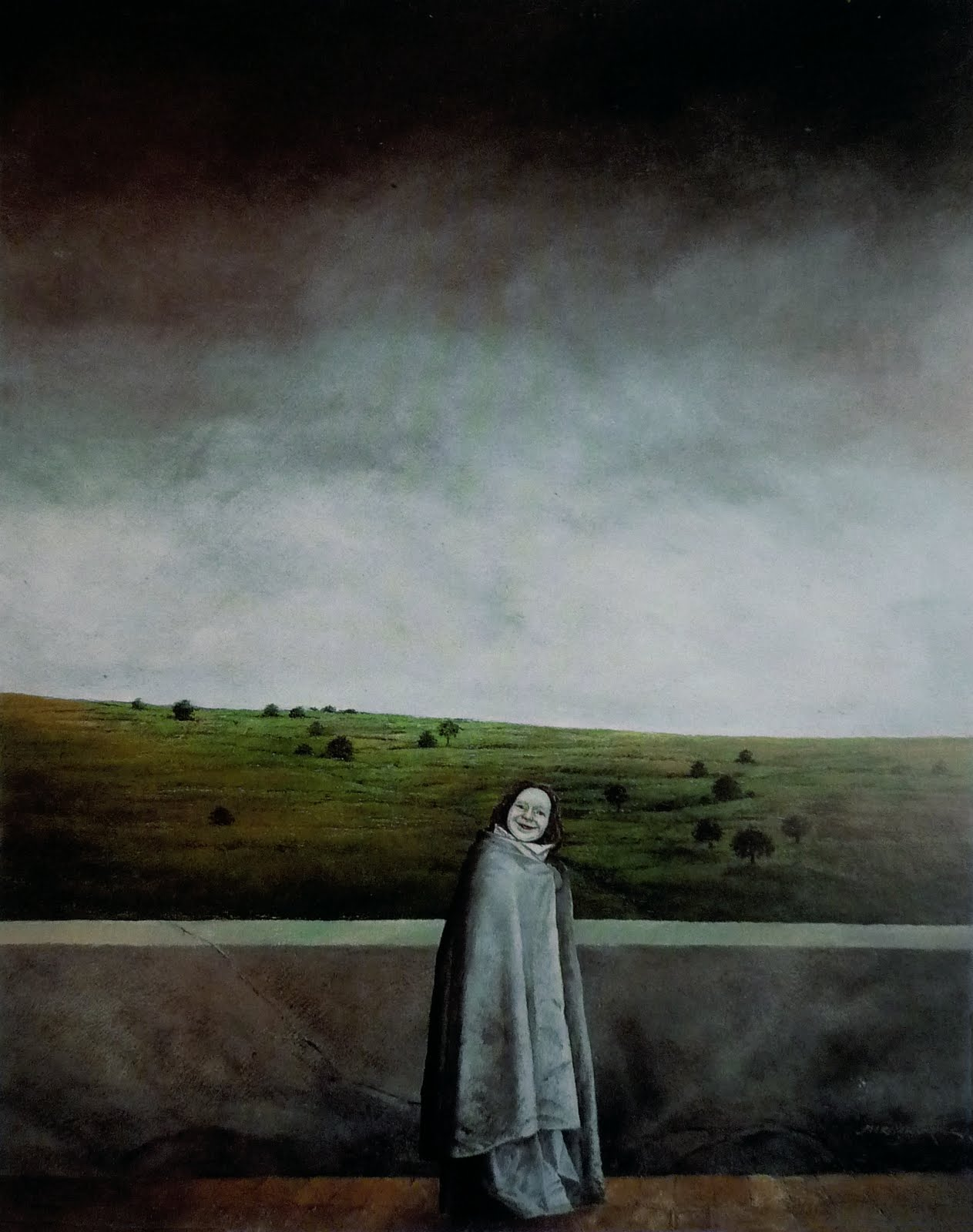
La loca Oil/wood 50x40 cm (1982)

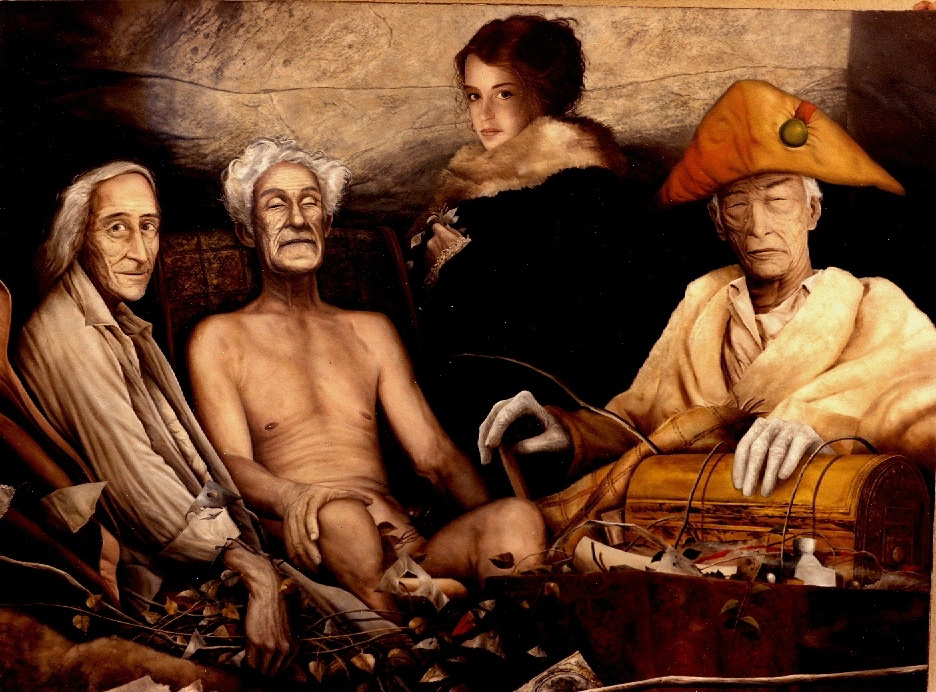
El sueño de un caduco (The dream of an expired) Oil/canvas 180x140 cm (1980)

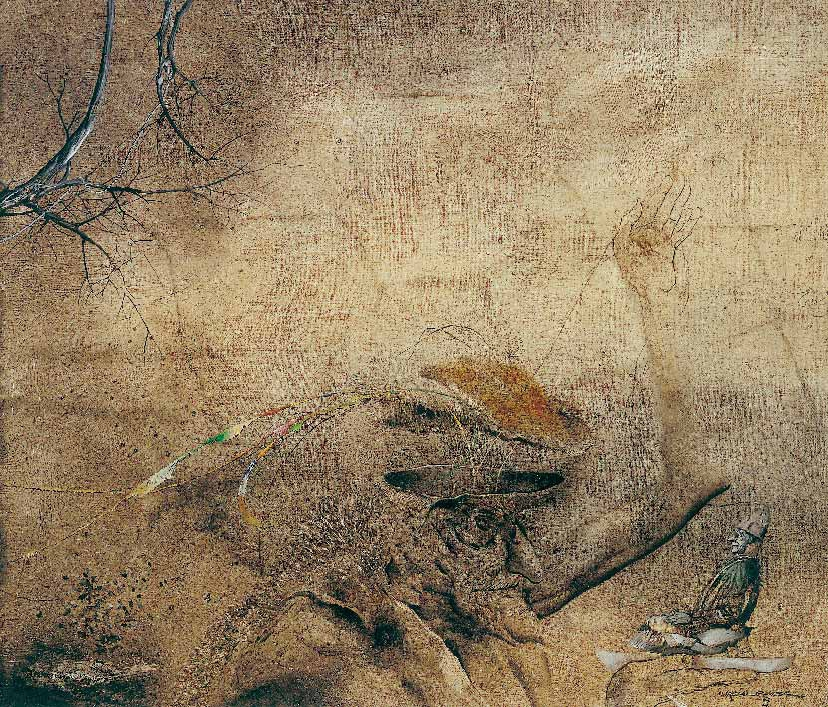
Bosco Oil/canvas 50x70 cm (1979)

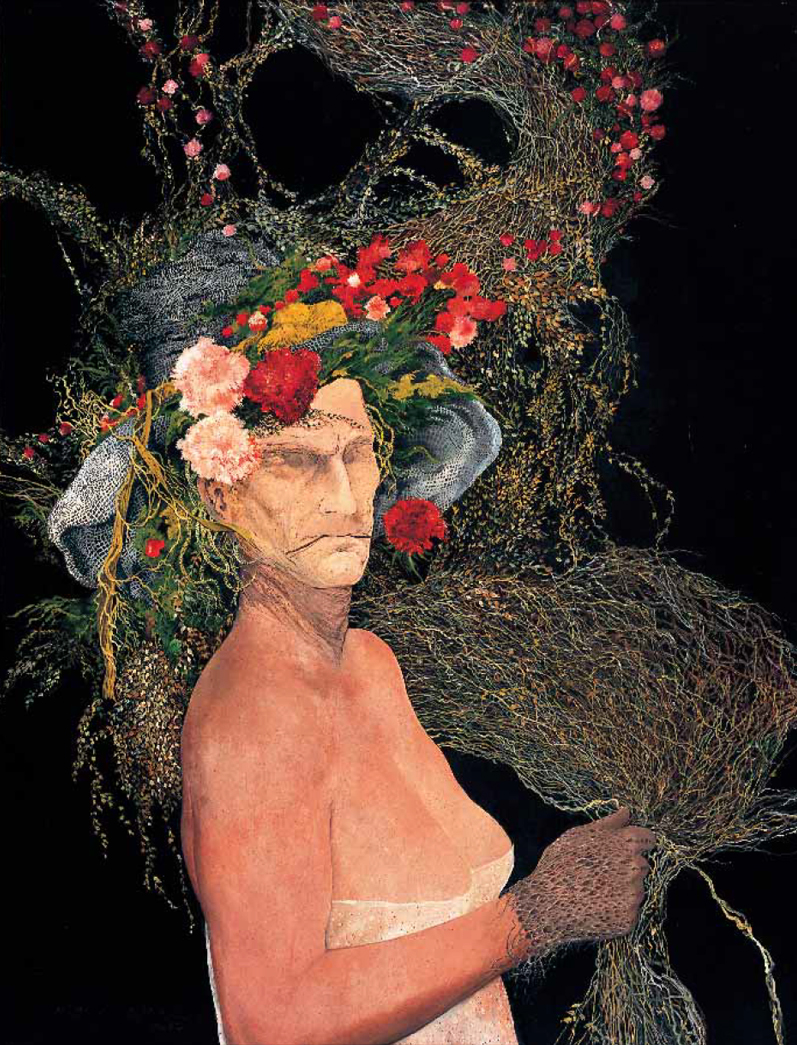
Antonella Oil/wood 80x80 cm (1979)
