= Acebo, Cáceres =

Acebo
- municipality
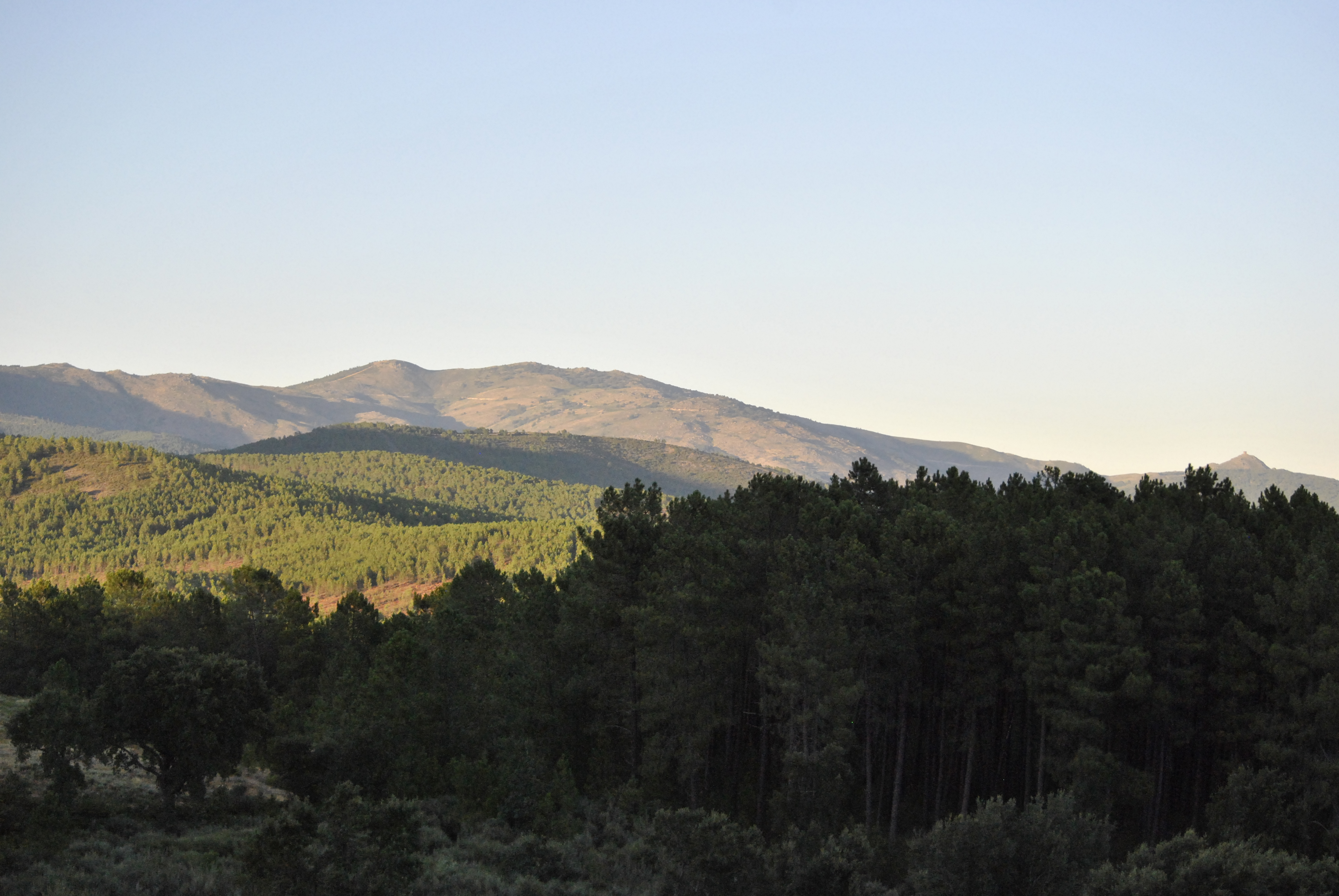
- The Sierra de Gata range seen from Acebo

- Coat of arms

- Location in Spain
- Coordinates: 40°12′N 6°42′W
- Country: Spain
- Autonomous community: Extremadura
- Province: Cáceres
- Comarca: Sierra de Gata

Government
  - Mayor: Julián Puerto Rodriguez (PSOE)

Area
  - Total: 57.40 km^{2} (22.16 sq mi)
- Elevation: 574 m (1,883 ft)

Population (2025-01-01)
  - Total: 567
  - Density: 9.88/km^{2} (25.6/sq mi)
- Demonym: Acebano/a
- Time zone: UTC+1 (CET)
  - Summer (DST): UTC+2 (CEST)
- Website: Official website

Acebo (Extremaduran: L'Acebu) is a municipality in Cáceres province, Extremadura, Spain. It is located in the northeast of the province, in the Sierra de Gata comarca.

== Demographics ==
Acebo has had the following population data decade by decade since 1900:

== See also ==
- List of municipalities in Cáceres
