= Saliega =

First Iberian lynx to successfully breed in captivity

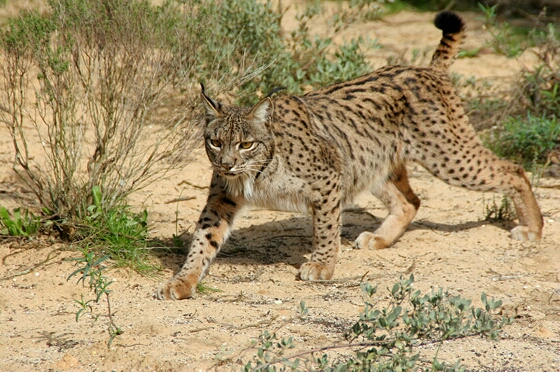
Saliega

Saliega was an Iberian lynx who in 2005 became the first of her species to give birth in captivity.

Saliega was born in the wild in March 2002 in Sierra Morena (Spain). As a one-month-old with little chance of survival in the wild, she was taken by the Andalusian authority and arrived at the Jerez zoo on 17 April 2002. There she was raised together with Aura, a female of the same age born in Doñana, until both were transferred to El Acebuche Breeding Center, in the Doñana Nature Park in Huelva, on 21 February 2003.

On 28 March 2005, Saliega became the first Iberian lynx to breed in captivity, giving birth to three healthy kittens. Prior attempts at captive breeding had failed because the mothers ate their kittens immediately after birth. The father was Garfio, a three-year-old male from Sierra Morena, who was taken to El Acebuche in February 2004 for the breeding program. Two of the cubs—Brezo and Brisa—survived while the third, Brezina, died as a consequence of a fight with Brezo.

On 22 March 2008, Saliega gave birth to three more kittens at the El Acebuche captive breeding centre in the Doñana Nature Park. They were born at 64 days gestation. One of the young was rejected by the mother, and the Junta de Andalucía's Environment Department reported on 24 March 2008 that the rejected kitten had died.

The IUCN has classified the Iberian lynx as Endangered, and it is considered the world's most threatened feline species. Studies conducted in March 2005 estimated the number of surviving Iberian lynx to be as few as 100, which is down from about 400 in 2000 and down from 4,000 in 1960. If the Iberian lynx were to become extinct, it would be the first big cat species to do so since the Smilodon became extinct 10,000 years ago.

Saliega produced a total of 16 offspring. In February 2013, she was sterilized following discovery of a mammary tumor, and her unfertilized eggs were collected and frozen. In January 2014, she retired at Zoobotánico de Jerez. She died there of natural causes in 2019.
