= Sierra de Gata =

Mountain range in Spain

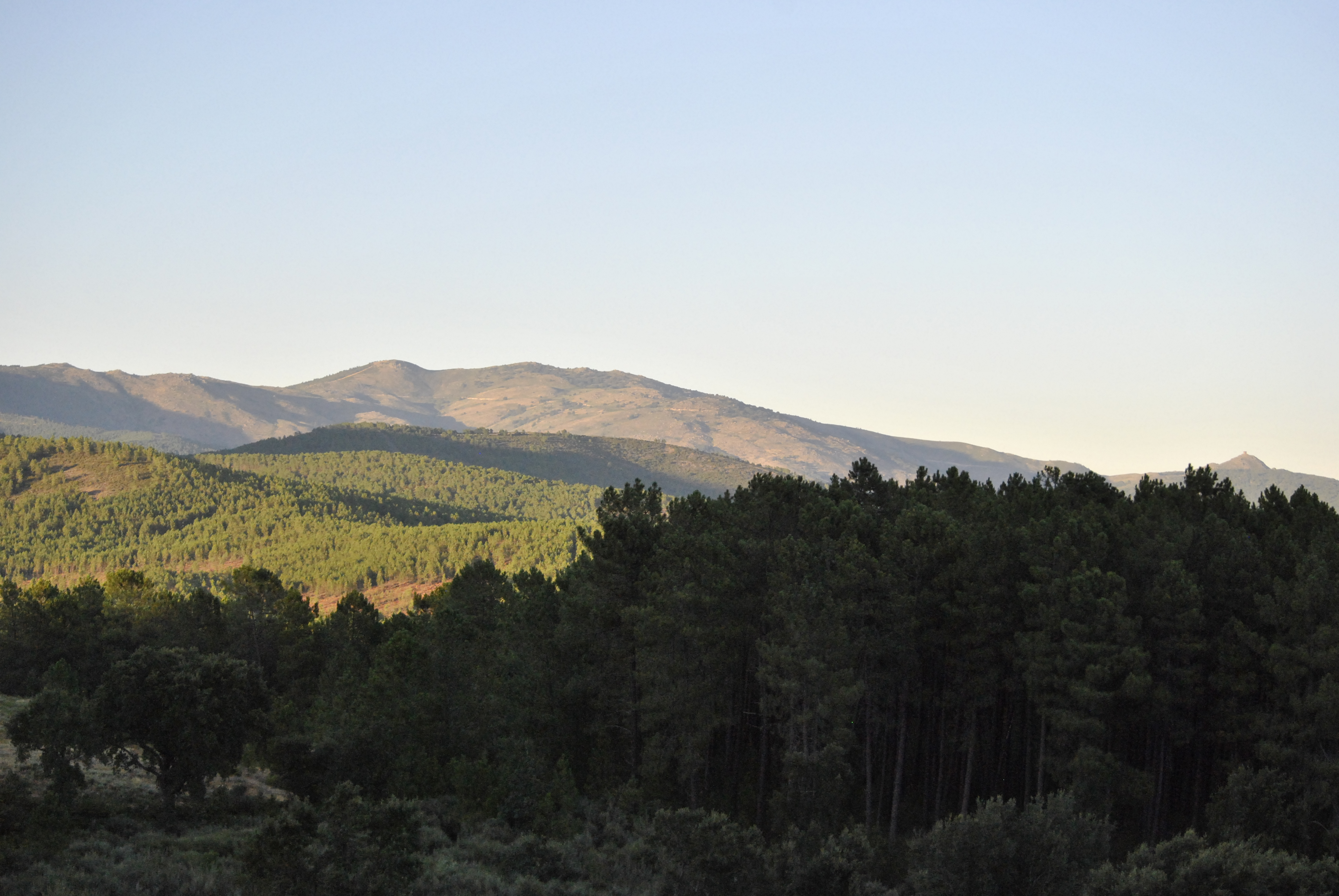
- View of the Sierra de Gata range from Acebo.

Highest point
- Elevation: 1,592 m (5,223 ft)
- Coordinates: 40.2°N 6.7°W

Geography
- Location: Iberian Peninsula, Spain
- Parent range: Sistema Central

Geology
- Rock type: Granite

Sierra de Gata (Extremaduran: Sierra e Gata) is one of the main mountain ranges in the Sistema Central, Spain. The highest point is Peña Canchera (1,592 m).

== Geography ==
The Sierra de Gata is located in the northwest of the province of Cáceres, which is in the autonomous community of Extremadura. It borders with Portugal on the west in the area of the Portuguese Serra da Malcata Natural Reserve.

Sierra de Gata is also the name of a comarca that includes of 20 municipalities located roughly in the same area as the mountains. The municipality of Moraleja is included in the Sierra de Gata comarca, even though it is geographically not in the mountainous area of the Sierra de Gata itself.

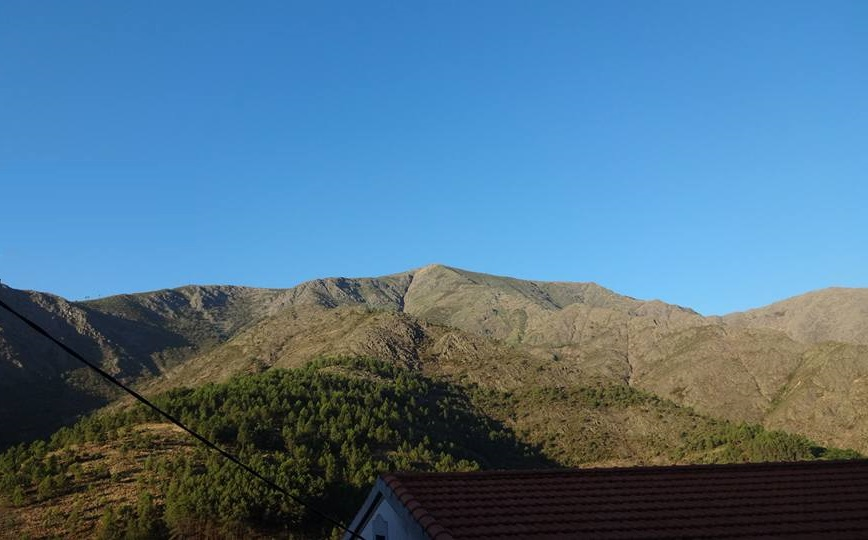
1,456 m high La Corredera peak seen from Huetre.

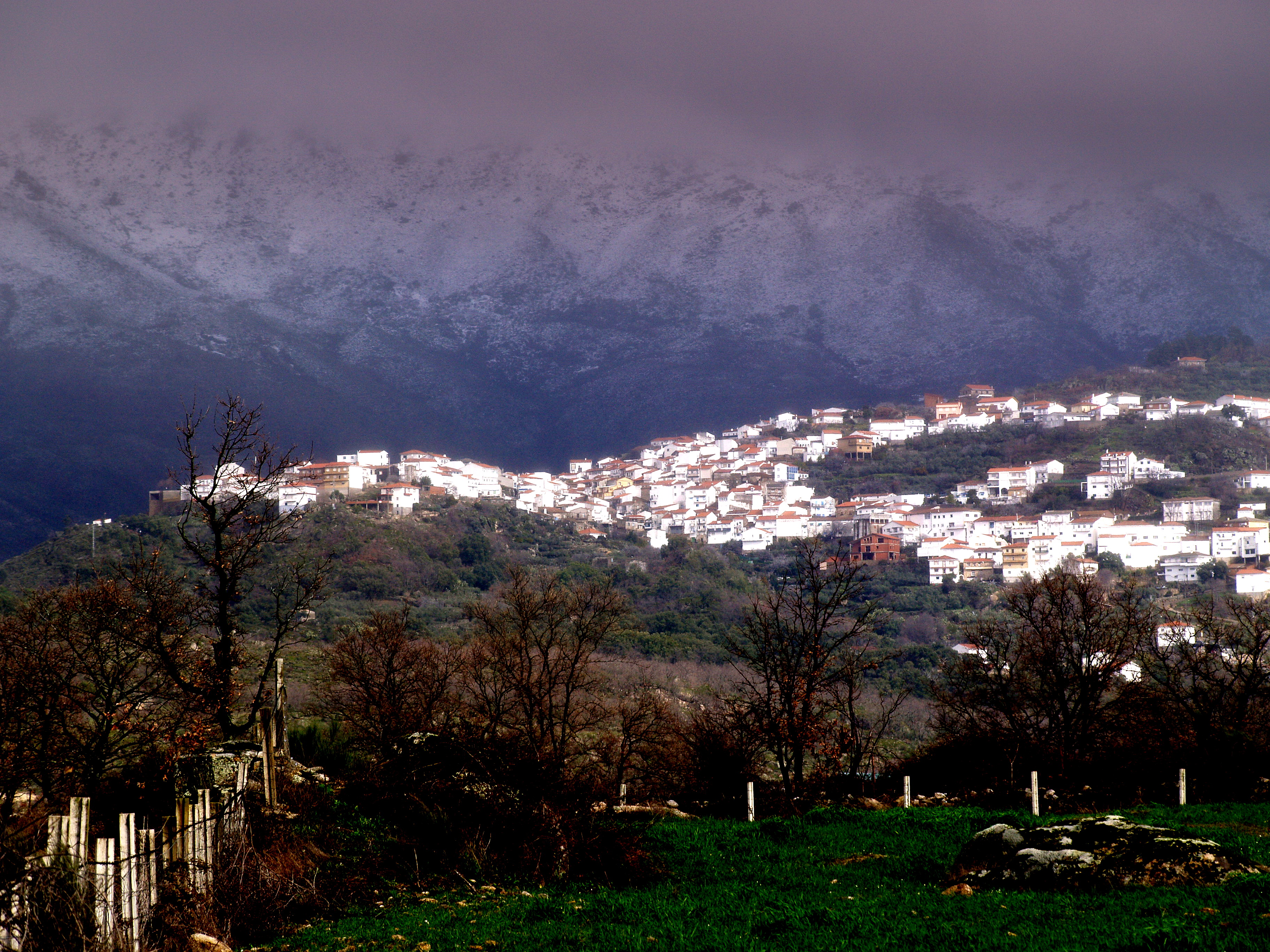
Sierra de Gata peaks in the winter looming over Eljas.

=== Peaks ===
The most important mountains of Sierra de Gata are (from West to East):

- Mesas (1,265 m)
- El Espinazo (1,330 m)
- Jálama (1,492 m)
- Jañona (1,367 m)
- Bolla Chica (1,408 m)
- Bolla (1,519 m)
- Arrobuey (1,412 m)
- La Corredera (1,456 m)
- Peña Canchera (1,592 m)
