= Eduardo Naranjo =

Spanish painter, engraved and sculptor (born 1944)

Eduardo Naranjo is a celebrated Spanish painter, born in 1944 in Monesterio, in the province of Badajoz, Extremadura, Spain. His work is considered part of the 'Neo -Realism' trend of Spanish art.

== Education ==
In 1957 he met his teacher Eduardo Acosta and entered the School of Arts and Crafts, where he remained until 1960. That same year he entered the School of Fine Arts of St. Elizabeth of Hungary. He moved to study at the School of Fine Arts of San Fernando in Madrid in 1961, where he studied painting .

== Works ==
Among his stage designs are the plays The House of Bernarda Alba by Federico García Lorca and Make me a story of the night by Jorge Marquez. In 1986 started a book of engravings of Lorca's work Poet in New York, which he finished in 1991. These were exhibited for the first time at the Madrid Book Fair in 1987.

== Awards ==
- 1958 - Prize drawing "The Old School" of Arts and Crafts in Seville
- 1961 - Award "Portraits" and prize drawing at the Royal Academy. Academy of Fine Arts of San Fernando
- 1974 - "Premio Luis de Morales" in Badajoz
- 1991 - "Today Extremadura" and Medal of Extremadura.
- 1994 - National Print Award María de Salamanca, Spanish Contemporary Engraving Museum, Marbella
- 1995 - It was awarded the Military Cross for his contribution to the Arts and the Army.
