= Serra da Malcata Nature Reserve =

Protected area in Portugal

- IUCN category IV (habitat/species management area)
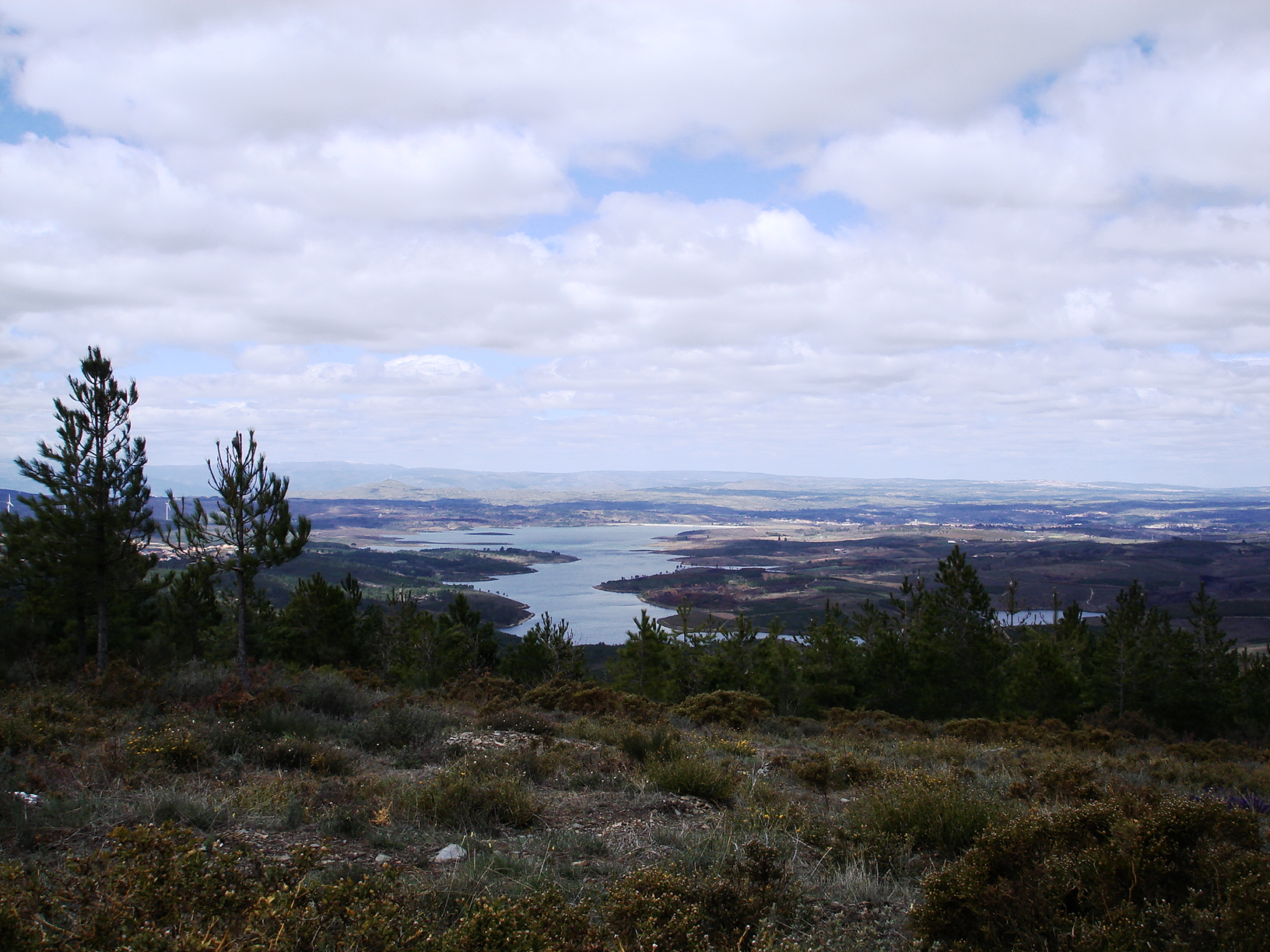

- Location within Portugal
- Location: Between the Castelo Branco, and Guarda Districts, Portugal
- Coordinates: 40°15′N 7°02′W
- Area: 16.159 hectares (39.93 acres)
- Max. elevation: 1,078 m (3,537 ft)
- Established: 1981

Serra da Malcata Nature Reserve is a Portuguese nature reserve. It was created in 1981 as a way to protect the then existent populations of Iberian lynx, since reintroduced; and in 1988, it was made a special protected area for birds.
