= Trevejo =

Trevejo is a surname. Notable people with the surname include:

- Iván Trevejo (born 1971), Cuban-born French fencer
- Malu Trevejo (born 2002), Cuban-born Spanish singer
