= Jesús Delgado Valhondo =

Spanish poet (1909–1993)

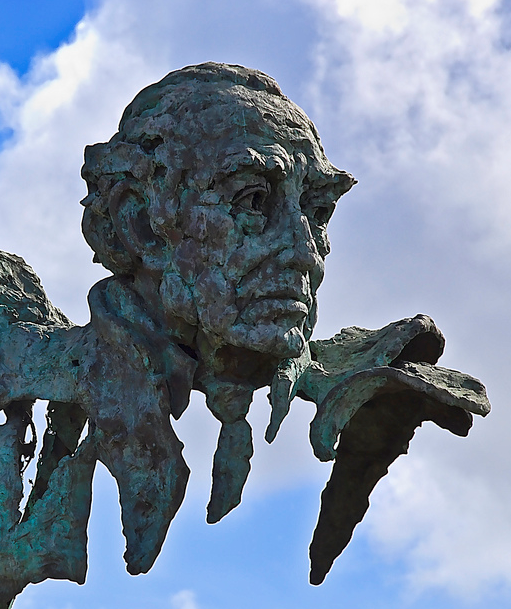
- Jesús Delgado Valhondo on the Monumento a los Tres Poetas in Badajoz, Spain. Sculpture by Luis Martínez Giraldo
- Born: 19 February 1909; Mérida, Spain
- Died: 23 July 1993 (aged 84); Badajoz, Spain
- Occupations: Poet and writer

Jesús Delgado Valhondo (19 February 1909 – 23 July 1993) was a Spanish poet.

== Biography ==
Jesús Delgado Valhondo was born in Mérida on 19 February 1909, but after the death of his father his family moved to Cáceres. When he was six he suffered an illness which left him lame. He studied teacher training and in 1934 began his career, but after the Spanish Civil War he was sanctioned for his affiliation to Alianza Republicana and for his work as Secretary of the Unión General de Trabajadores.

He was co-founder of the Spanish literary magazine Alcántara (1945), and of the Association of Extremaduran Writers (Asociación de Escritores Extremeños), of which today he is honorary president. Through his literary work he received the recognition of artists such as Nobel prize winner Juan Ramón Jiménez who declared:

Ahora se escribe en España muy buena poesía. Aquí traigo un libro, La esquina y el viento, de Delgado Valhondo, nutrido de la mejor poesía moderna. Now very good poetry is being written in Spain. Here I bring a book, La esquina y el viento, by Delgado Valhondo, nourished with the best of modern poetry

In 1978 he received the "Hispanidad" prize for poetry, in 1979 he became deputy mayor of Badajoz with the Unión de Centro Democrático (Union of the Democratic Centre) and in 1988 he was given the Medal of Extremadura for his human, professional and literary merits.

Since his death on 23 July 1993, several compilation books have been published and the Delgado Valhondo Foundation has been created in order to promote his work. The Public State Library in Mérida bears his name.

== Bibliography ==
Poetry

- Hojas húmedas y verdes. Alicante, Colección "Leila", 1944
- El año cero. San Sebastián, Cuadernos de poesía "Norte", 1950
- La esquina y el viento. Santander, Colección "Tito Hombre", 1952.
- La muerte del momento, en revista Gévora, número 32, Badajoz, 31 junio 1955.
- Canto a Extremadura, en revista Gévora, números 33–45, Badajoz, 30 agosto 1956.
- La montaña. Santander, Colección "La cigarra", 1957.
- Primera antología. Badajoz, Diputación Provincial, 1961.
- El secreto de los árboles. Palencia, Colección "Rocamador", 1963.
- ¿Dónde ponemos los asombros?. Salamanca, Colección "Álamo", 1969.
- Canas de Dios en el almendro. Sevilla, Colección "Angaro", 1961.
- Cerrada claridad. Sevilla, Colección "Angaro", 1973.
- La vara de avellano. Sevilla, Colección "Angaro", 1974 .
- Entre la hierba pisada queda noche sin pisar (antología). Badajoz, Universitas Editorial, 1979.
- Un árbol solo. Badajoz, Institución cultural Pedro de Valencia, Diputación Provincial, 1979.
- Inefable noviembre. Algeciras, Colección "Bahía", 1981; reedited, with several variations under the title Inefable domingo de noviembre, Cáceres, Institución Cultural "El Brocense", 1982
- Poesía (1943–1988). Obras completas. Badajoz, Diputación Provincial, 1988
- Huir. Badajoz, Del Oeste ediciones, 1994

Prose

- Yo soy el otoño, colección Alcántara.
- Cuentos y narraciones. Cáceres, editorial Extremadura, 1975.
- Ayer y ahora. Badajoz, Universitas Editorial, 1978.
- Abanico. Mérida, Patronato de la Biblioteca Pública, 1986.
- Cuentos. Badajoz, Diputación Provincial, 1986.
- El otro día. Badajoz, Menfis, 1990.
