= Enrique Moreno González =

Spanish surgeon (born 1939)

Enrique Moreno
- Born: Enrique Moreno González; 1939; Madrid, Spain
- Education: University of Madrid
- Scientific career
- Fields: Surgery; Organ transplantation
- Workplaces: Complutense University of Madrid

Enrique Moreno González (born 1939) is a Spanish surgeon specialized in organ transplantation. He is a member of the Royal National Academy of Medicine of Spain.

Moreno made important medical contributions such as: treatment of portal hypertension, malignant tumors of the biliary tract and liver. He developed new surgical procedures, such as mesenteric-caval bypass of the internal jugular vein or the treatment of cancer of the cardia by extended esophagogastrectomy.

In 1999, he was awarded the Prince of Asturias Awards for Technical and Scientific Research along Ricardo Miledi.
