= Moraleja =

- municipality
- Flag Coat of arms

- Location within Spain
- Coordinates: 40°04′N 6°39′W
- Country: Spain
- Autonomous community: Extremadura
- Province: Cáceres
- Comarca: Sierra de Gata

Area
  - Total: 124.54 km^{2} (48.09 sq mi)
- Elevation: 261 m (856 ft)

Population (2025-01-01)
  - Total: 6,562
  - Density: 52.69/km^{2} (136.5/sq mi)
- Time zone: UTC+1 (CET)
  - Summer (DST): UTC+2 (CEST)

Moraleja (Spanish: [moɾaˈlexa]) is a municipality located in the province of Cáceres, Extremadura, Spain. It is the most important town in the Sierra de Gata comarca. The Postal Code is 10128. In 1915 there was a massacre at the Finca the Malladas, the farm owned by Agustín, the second Count of Malladas. Five people were slain, among them two children. Five local men were arrested for the crime, but many believe they were framed.

The Town Hall is currently heavily indebted. This municipality is included in the Sierra de Gata comarca, although it is in the Árrago River basin, geographically not in the mountainous area of the Sierra de Gata.

== Villages ==
- Moraleja
- Cañadas
- Malladas
- La Mata
- Pedrizas
- Porciones
- La Quinta
- Rozacorderos

== See also ==
- List of municipalities in Cáceres
- The Massacre at the Finca de Malladas (podcast)
