= 1983 Spanish local elections in Extremadura =

This article presents the results breakdown of the local elections held in Extremadura on 8 May 1983. The following tables show detailed results in the autonomous community's most populous municipalities, sorted alphabetically.

== City control ==
The following table lists party control in the most populous municipalities, including provincial capitals (highlighted in bold). Gains for a party are highlighted in that party's colour.

Municipality	Population	Previous control	New control
Almendralejo	23,720	Union of the Democratic Centre (UCD)	Spanish Socialist Workers' Party (PSOE)
**Badajoz**	111,456	Union of the Democratic Centre (UCD)	Spanish Socialist Workers' Party (PSOE)
**Cáceres**	65,758	Union of the Democratic Centre (UCD)	Spanish Socialist Workers' Party (PSOE)
Mérida	41,027	Spanish Socialist Workers' Party (PSOE)	Spanish Socialist Workers' Party (PSOE)
Plasencia	31,201	Union of the Democratic Centre (UCD)	Union of Independent Placentine People (UPI)

== Municipalities ==
=== Almendralejo ===
Population: 23,720

← Summary of the 8 May 1983 City Council of Almendralejo election results →
Parties and alliances	Popular vote			Seats	
Parties and alliances	Votes	%	±pp	Total	+/−
Spanish Socialist Workers' Party (PSOE)	7,249	57.45	+26.67	**12**	+5
People's Coalition (AP–PDP–UL)^{1}	3,957	31.36	+24.84	**7**	+5
Communist Party of Spain (PCE)	760	6.02	−3.03	**1**	−1
Independent Farmers of Almendralejo (AIA)	651	5.16	New	**1**	+1
Union of the Democratic Centre (UCD)	n/a	n/a	−41.59	0	−10
Blank ballots	0	0.00	±0.00		
**Total**	**12,617**			**21**	**±0**
Valid votes	12,617	100.00	+0.72		
Invalid votes	0	0.00	−0.72		
**Votes cast / turnout**	**12,617**	**73.70**	**+3.75**		
Abstentions	4,503	26.30	−3.75		
**Registered voters**	**15,460**				
Sources
Footnotes: ^{1} People's Coalition results are compared to Democratic Coalition totals in the 1979 election.

=== Badajoz ===
Population: 111,456

← Summary of the 8 May 1983 City Council of Badajoz election results →
Parties and alliances	Popular vote			Seats	
Parties and alliances	Votes	%	±pp	Total	+/−
Spanish Socialist Workers' Party (PSOE)	24,583	52.44	+15.93	**15**	+5
People's Coalition (AP–PDP–UL)	16,115	34.38	New	**10**	+10
Communist Party of Spain (PCE)	3,282	7.00	−4.24	**2**	−1
Independents (INDEP)	1,905	4.06	New	0	±0
Independents (INDEP)	991	2.11	New	0	±0
Union of the Democratic Centre (UCD)	n/a	n/a	−48.43	0	−14
Blank ballots	0	0.00	±0.00		
**Total**	**46,876**			**27**	**±0**
Valid votes	46,876	100.00	+1.29		
Invalid votes	0	0.00	−1.29		
**Votes cast / turnout**	**46,876**	**62.35**	**+4.18**		
Abstentions	28,309	37.65	−4.18		
**Registered voters**	**75,185**				

=== Cáceres ===
Population: 65,758

← Summary of the 8 May 1983 City Council of Cáceres election results →
Parties and alliances	Popular vote			Seats	
Parties and alliances	Votes	%	±pp	Total	+/−
Spanish Socialist Workers' Party (PSOE)	13,491	43.36	+10.04	**12**	+3
People's Coalition (AP–PDP–UL)	9,845	31.64	New	**9**	+9
United Extremadura (EU)	3,142	10.10	New	**2**	+2
Independent Cáceres Group (ACI)	2,617	8.41	−8.77	**2**	−2
Communist Party of Spain (PCE)	1,082	3.48	−5.48	0	−2
Democratic and Social Centre (CDS)	620	1.99	New	0	±0
Extremaduran Popular Bloc (BPEx)	316	1.02	New	0	±0
Union of the Democratic Centre (UCD)	n/a	n/a	−40.53	0	−10
Blank ballots	0	0.00	±0.00		
**Total**	**31,113**			**25**	**±0**
Valid votes	31,113	100.00	+1.02		
Invalid votes	0	0.00	−1.02		
**Votes cast / turnout**	**31,113**	**67.84**	**+3.67**		
Abstentions	14,752	32.16	−3.67		
**Registered voters**	**45,865**				

=== Mérida ===
Population: 41,027

← Summary of the 8 May 1983 City Council of Mérida election results →
Parties and alliances	Popular vote			Seats	
Parties and alliances	Votes	%	±pp	Total	+/−
Spanish Socialist Workers' Party (PSOE)	12,338	63.53	+27.38	**14**	+6
People's Coalition (AP–PDP–UL)	5,030	25.90	New	**5**	+5
Communist Party of Spain (PCE)	2,054	10.58	+6.57	**2**	+2
Union of the Democratic Centre (UCD)	n/a	n/a	−46.02	0	−10
Workers' Revolutionary Organization (ORT)	n/a	n/a	−13.82	0	−3
Blank ballots	0	0.00	±0.00		
**Total**	**19,422**			**21**	**±0**
Valid votes	19,422	100.00	+0.89		
Invalid votes	0	0.00	−0.89		
**Votes cast / turnout**	**19,422**	**69.99**	**+6.52**		
Abstentions	8,328	30.01	−6.52		
**Registered voters**	**27,750**				

=== Plasencia ===
Population: 31,201

← Summary of the 8 May 1983 City Council of Plasencia election results →
Parties and alliances	Popular vote			Seats	
Parties and alliances	Votes	%	±pp	Total	+/−
Union of Independent Placentine People (UPI)^{1}	7,177	44.89	+5.08	**10**	+1
Spanish Socialist Workers' Party (PSOE)	4,770	29.83	+3.45	**7**	+1
People's Coalition (AP–PDP–UL)	3,209	20.07	New	**4**	+4
Communist Party of Spain (PCE)	517	3.23	−2.66	0	−1
United Extremadura (EU)	315	1.97	New	0	±0
Electoral Grouping (AGRUP/2)	n/a	n/a	−20.29	0	−5
Blank ballots	0	0.00	±0.00		
**Total**	**15,988**			**21**	**±0**
Valid votes	15,988	100.00	+0.94		
Invalid votes	0	0.00	−0.94		
**Votes cast / turnout**	**15,988**	**74.08**	**+6.46**		
Abstentions	5,594	25.92	−6.46		
**Registered voters**	**21,582**				
Sources
Footnotes: ^{1} Union of Independent Placentine People results are compared to Union of the Democratic Centre totals in the 1979 election.

== See also ==
- 1983 Extremaduran regional election
