= Adolfo Díaz-Ambrona =

Adolfo Díaz-Ambrona may refer to:

- Adolfo Díaz-Ambrona Moreno (1908–1971), Spanish politician, Minister of Agriculture
- Adolfo Díaz-Ambrona Bardají (1942–2012), Spanish politician, son of above, member of Assembly of Extremadura
