= 1991 Spanish local elections in Extremadura =

This article presents the results breakdown of the local elections held in Extremadura on 26 May 1991. The following tables show detailed results in the autonomous community's most populous municipalities, sorted alphabetically.

== City control ==
The following table lists party control in the most populous municipalities, including provincial capitals (highlighted in bold). Gains for a party are highlighted in that party's colour.

Municipality	Population	Previous control	New control
Almendralejo	25,485	Spanish Socialist Workers' Party (PSOE)	Spanish Socialist Workers' Party (PSOE)
**Badajoz**	126,781	Spanish Socialist Workers' Party (PSOE)	Spanish Socialist Workers' Party (PSOE)
**Cáceres**	73,915	Spanish Socialist Workers' Party (PSOE)	Spanish Socialist Workers' Party (PSOE)
Mérida	53,732	Spanish Socialist Workers' Party (PSOE)	Spanish Socialist Workers' Party (PSOE)
Plasencia	34,488	Democratic and Social Centre (CDS)	Spanish Socialist Workers' Party (PSOE)

== Municipalities ==
=== Almendralejo ===
Population: 25,485

← Summary of the 26 May 1991 City Council of Almendralejo election results →
Parties and alliances	Popular vote			Seats	
Parties and alliances	Votes	%	±pp	Total	+/−
Spanish Socialist Workers' Party (PSOE)	6,892	50.81	+4.02	11	±0
People's Party (PP)^{1}	3,750	27.65	−5.51	6	−1
Democratic and Social Centre (CDS)	1,179	8.69	−3.70	2	±0
Extremaduran Regionalist Party (PREx)	857	6.32	New	1	+1
United Left (IU)	774	5.71	−1.23	1	±0
Blank ballots	111	0.82	+0.10		
**Total**	**13,563**			21	**±0**
Valid votes	13,563	99.12	−0.04		
Invalid votes	120	0.88	+0.04		
**Votes cast / turnout**	**13,683**	**73.91**	**−5.58**		
Abstentions	4,831	26.09	+5.58		
**Registered voters**	**18,514**				
Sources
Footnotes: ^{1} People's Party results are compared to the combined totals of People's Alliance and People's Democratic Party in the 1987 election.

=== Badajoz ===
Population: 126,781

← Summary of the 26 May 1991 City Council of Badajoz election results →
Parties and alliances	Popular vote			Seats	
Parties and alliances	Votes	%	±pp	Total	+/−
Spanish Socialist Workers' Party (PSOE)	26,874	51.04	+3.70	**15**	±0
People's Party (PP)^{1}	17,723	33.66	+4.22	**10**	+2
United Left (IU)	3,927	7.46	+2.84	**2**	+2
Democratic and Social Centre (CDS)	2,563	4.87	−9.08	0	−4
United Extremadura (EU)	951	1.81	−0.89	0	±0
Blank ballots	613	1.16	+0.08		
**Total**	**52,651**			**27**	**±0**
Valid votes	52,651	99.29	+0.98		
Invalid votes	379	0.71	−0.98		
**Votes cast / turnout**	**53,030**	**57.60**	**−9.48**		
Abstentions	39,043	42.40	+9.48		
**Registered voters**	**92,073**				
Sources
Footnotes: ^{1} People's Party results are compared to the combined totals of People's Alliance and People's Democratic Party in the 1987 election.

=== Cáceres ===
Population: 73,915

← Summary of the 26 May 1991 City Council of Cáceres election results →
Parties and alliances	Popular vote			Seats	
Parties and alliances	Votes	%	±pp	Total	+/−
People's Party (PP)^{1}	13,218	39.44	+3.48	**12**	+3
Spanish Socialist Workers' Party (PSOE)	12,928	38.57	+5.87	**12**	+3
United Extremadura (EU)	1,688	5.04	−6.56	**1**	−2
United Left (IU)	1,659	4.95	+1.63	0	±0
Democratic and Social Centre (CDS)	1,505	4.49	−9.43	0	−4
Cáceres Independent Candidacy (CIC)	1,335	3.98	New	0	±0
Extremaduran Regionalist Party (PREx)	791	2.36	New	0	±0
Blank ballots	394	1.18	−0.04		
**Total**	**33,518**			**25**	**±0**
Valid votes	33,518	99.35	+0.99		
Invalid votes	220	0.65	−0.99		
**Votes cast / turnout**	**33,738**	**61.14**	**−11.33**		
Abstentions	21,440	38.86	+11.33		
**Registered voters**	**55,178**				
Sources
Footnotes: ^{1} People's Party results are compared to the combined totals of People's Alliance, Liberal Party and People's Democratic Party in the 1987 election.

=== Mérida ===
Population: 53,732

← Summary of the 26 May 1991 City Council of Mérida election results →
Parties and alliances	Popular vote			Seats	
Parties and alliances	Votes	%	±pp	Total	+/−
Spanish Socialist Workers' Party (PSOE)	11,111	52.16	+1.42	**15**	+1
People's Party (PP)^{1}	4,788	22.48	−2.47	**6**	±0
United Left (IU)	3,407	15.99	+2.33	**4**	+1
Democratic and Social Centre (CDS)	1,019	4.78	−4.69	0	−2
Extremaduran Regionalist Party (PREx)	303	1.42	New	0	±0
Communist Party of the Peoples of Spain (PCPE)	246	1.15	New	0	±0
United Extremadura (EU)	226	1.06	New	0	±0
Blank ballots	203	0.95	+0.06		
**Total**	**21,303**			**25**	**±0**
Valid votes	21,303	99.17	+0.39		
Invalid votes	178	0.83	−0.39		
**Votes cast / turnout**	**21,481**	**59.46**	**−6.10**		
Abstentions	14,645	40.54	+6.10		
**Registered voters**	**36,126**				
Sources
Footnotes: ^{1} People's Party results are compared to the combined totals of People's Alliance and People's Democratic Party in the 1987 election.

=== Plasencia ===
Population: 34,488

← Summary of the 26 May 1991 City Council of Plasencia election results →
Parties and alliances	Popular vote			Seats	
Parties and alliances	Votes	%	±pp	Total	+/−
Spanish Socialist Workers' Party (PSOE)	6,689	41.00	+6.72	**11**	+3
Democratic and Social Centre (CDS)	3,436	21.06	−16.61	**5**	−4
People's Party (PP)^{1}	2,799	17.16	+0.29	**4**	+1
United Left (IU)	966	5.92	+4.34	**1**	+1
Plasencia Solution Independents (ISP)	752	4.61	New	0	±0
Extremaduran Regionalist Party (PREx)	671	4.11	New	0	±0
United Extremadura (EU)	479	2.94	−3.67	0	−1
Independents: Electors' Grouping (I:AE)	181	1.11	New	0	±0
Independent Placentine Initiative (IPI)	140	0.86	New	0	±0
Blank ballots	200	1.23	+0.14		
**Total**	**16,313**			**21**	**±0**
Valid votes	16,313	99.54	+0.81		
Invalid votes	75	0.46	−0.81		
**Votes cast / turnout**	**16,388**	**63.94**	**−6.19**		
Abstentions	9,244	36.06	+6.19		
**Registered voters**	**25,632**				
Sources
Footnotes: ^{1} People's Party results are compared to the combined totals of People's Alliance, Liberal Party and People's Democratic Party in the 1987 election.

== See also ==
- 1991 Extremaduran regional election
