= 1987 Spanish local elections in Extremadura =

This article presents the results breakdown of the local elections held in Extremadura on 10 June 1987. The following tables show detailed results in the autonomous community's most populous municipalities, sorted alphabetically.

== City control ==
The following table lists party control in the most populous municipalities, including provincial capitals (highlighted in bold). Gains for a party are highlighted in that party's colour.

Municipality	Population	Previous control	New control
Almendralejo	24,966	Spanish Socialist Workers' Party (PSOE)	Spanish Socialist Workers' Party (PSOE)
**Badajoz**	118,852	Spanish Socialist Workers' Party (PSOE)	Spanish Socialist Workers' Party (PSOE)
**Cáceres**	69,193	Spanish Socialist Workers' Party (PSOE)	Spanish Socialist Workers' Party (PSOE)
Mérida	51,641	Spanish Socialist Workers' Party (PSOE)	Spanish Socialist Workers' Party (PSOE)
Plasencia	32,430	Union of Independent Placentine People (UPI)	Democratic and Social Centre (CDS)

== Municipalities ==
=== Almendralejo ===
Population: 24,966

← Summary of the 10 June 1987 City Council of Almendralejo election results →
Parties and alliances	Popular vote			Seats	
Parties and alliances	Votes	%	±pp	Total	+/−
Spanish Socialist Workers' Party (PSOE)	6,475	46.79	−10.66	**11**	−1
People's Alliance (AP)^{1}	4,548	32.86	+1.50	**7**	±0
Democratic and Social Centre (CDS)	1,714	12.39	New	**2**	+2
United Left (IU)^{2}	960	6.94	+0.92	**1**	±0
People's Democratic Party (PDP)	42	0.30	New	0	±0
Independent Farmers of Almendralejo (AIA)	n/a	n/a	−5.16	0	−1
Blank ballots	100	0.72	+0.72		
**Total**	**13,839**			**21**	**±0**
Valid votes	13,839	99.16	−0.84		
Invalid votes	117	0.84	+0.84		
**Votes cast / turnout**	**13,956**	**79.49**	**+5.79**		
Abstentions	3,602	20.51	−5.79		
**Registered voters**	**17,558**				
Sources
Footnotes: ^{1} People's Alliance results are compared to People's Coalition totals in the 1983 election.; ^{2} United Left results are compared to Communist Party of Spain totals in the 1983 election.

=== Badajoz ===
Population: 118,852

← Summary of the 10 June 1987 City Council of Badajoz election results →
Parties and alliances	Popular vote			Seats	
Parties and alliances	Votes	%	±pp	Total	+/−
Spanish Socialist Workers' Party (PSOE)	26,566	47.34	−5.10	**15**	±0
People's Alliance (AP)^{1}	15,826	28.20	−6.18	**8**	−2
Democratic and Social Centre (CDS)	7,830	13.95	New	**4**	+4
United Left (IU)^{2}	2,595	4.62	−2.38	0	−2
United Extremadura (EU)	1,513	2.70	New	0	±0
People's Democratic Party (PDP)	695	1.24	New	0	±0
Humanist Platform (PH)	481	0.86	New	0	±0
Blank ballots	608	1.08	+1.08		
**Total**	**56,114**			**27**	**±0**
Valid votes	56,114	98.31	−1.69		
Invalid votes	965	1.69	+1.69		
**Votes cast / turnout**	**57,079**	**67.08**	**+4.73**		
Abstentions	28,006	32.92	−4.73		
**Registered voters**	**85,085**				
Sources
Footnotes: ^{1} People's Alliance results are compared to People's Coalition totals in the 1983 election.; ^{2} United Left results are compared to Communist Party of Spain totals in the 1983 election.

=== Cáceres ===
Population: 69,193

← Summary of the 10 June 1987 City Council of Cáceres election results →
Parties and alliances	Popular vote			Seats	
Parties and alliances	Votes	%	±pp	Total	+/−
Spanish Socialist Workers' Party (PSOE)	11,618	32.70	−10.66	**9**	−3
People's Alliance (AP)^{1}	11,284	31.76	+0.12	**9**	±0
Democratic and Social Centre (CDS)	4,944	13.92	+11.93	**4**	+4
United Extremadura (EU)	4,123	11.60	+1.50	**3**	+1
United Left (IU)^{2}	1,180	3.32	−0.16	0	±0
Liberal Party (PL)	948	2.67	New	0	±0
People's Democratic Party (PDP)	545	1.53	New	0	±0
Workers' Party of Spain–Communist Unity (PTE–UC)	296	0.83	New	0	±0
Humanist Platform (PH)	157	0.44	New	0	±0
Independent Cáceres Group (ACI)	n/a	n/a	−8.41	0	−2
Blank ballots	434	1.22	+1.22		
**Total**	**35,529**			**25**	**±0**
Valid votes	35,529	98.36	−1.64		
Invalid votes	592	1.64	+1.64		
**Votes cast / turnout**	**36,121**	**72.47**	**+4.63**		
Abstentions	13,719	27.53	−4.63		
**Registered voters**	**49,840**				
Sources
Footnotes: ^{1} People's Alliance results are compared to People's Coalition totals in the 1983 election.; ^{2} United Left results are compared to Communist Party of Spain totals in the 1983 election.

=== Mérida ===
Population: 51,641

← Summary of the 10 June 1987 City Council of Mérida election results →
Parties and alliances	Popular vote			Seats	
Parties and alliances	Votes	%	±pp	Total	+/−
Spanish Socialist Workers' Party (PSOE)	11,630	50.74	−12.79	**14**	±0
People's Alliance (AP)^{1}	5,037	21.97	−3.93	**6**	+1
United Left (IU)^{2}	3,117	13.60	+3.02	**3**	+1
Democratic and Social Centre (CDS)	2,170	9.47	New	**2**	+2
People's Democratic Party (PDP)	683	2.98	New	0	±0
Humanist Platform (PH)	82	0.36	New	0	±0
Blank ballots	203	0.89	+0.89		
**Total**	**22,922**			**25**	**+4**
Valid votes	22,922	98.78	−1.22		
Invalid votes	284	1.22	+1.22		
**Votes cast / turnout**	**23,206**	**65.56**	**−4.43**		
Abstentions	12,192	34.44	+4.43		
**Registered voters**	**35,398**				
Sources
Footnotes: ^{1} People's Alliance results are compared to People's Coalition totals in the 1983 election.; ^{2} United Left results are compared to Communist Party of Spain totals in the 1983 election.

=== Plasencia ===
Population: 32,430

← Summary of the 10 June 1987 City Council of Plasencia election results →
Parties and alliances	Popular vote			Seats	
Parties and alliances	Votes	%	±pp	Total	+/−
Democratic and Social Centre (CDS)^{1}	6,196	37.67	−7.22	**9**	−1
Spanish Socialist Workers' Party (PSOE)	5,639	34.28	+4.45	**8**	+1
People's Alliance (AP)^{2}	2,259	13.73	−6.34	**3**	−1
United Extremadura (EU)	1,088	6.61	+4.64	**1**	+1
Liberal Party (PL)	340	2.07	New	0	±0
Left Extremaduran Front (FEI)	313	1.90	New	0	±0
United Left (IU)^{3}	260	1.58	−1.65	0	±0
People's Democratic Party (PDP)	176	1.07	New	0	±0
Blank ballots	179	1.09	+1.09		
**Total**	**16,450**			**21**	**±0**
Valid votes	16,450	98.73	−1.27		
Invalid votes	212	1.27	+1.27		
**Votes cast / turnout**	**16,662**	**70.13**	**−3.95**		
Abstentions	7,098	29.87	+3.95		
**Registered voters**	**23,760**				
Sources
Footnotes: ^{1} Democratic and Social Centre results are compared to Union of Independent Placentine People totals in the 1983 election.; ^{2} People's Alliance results are compared to People's Coalition totals in the 1983 election.; ^{3} United Left results are compared to Communist Party of Spain totals in the 1983 election.

== See also ==
- 1987 Extremaduran regional election
