= 1983 Extremaduran regional election =

Election in the Spanish region of Extremadura

- 8 May 1983

All 65 seats in the Assembly of Extremadura 33 seats needed for a majority
- Registered: 786,200
- Turnout: 565,244 (71.9%)
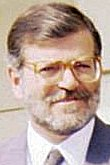

	First party	Second party	Third party
Leader	Juan Carlos Rodríguez Ibarra	Adolfo Díaz-Ambrona	Pedro Cañada
Party	PSOE	AP–PDP–UL	EU
Leader since	20 December 1982	1976	10 December 1980
Leader's seat	Badajoz	Badajoz	Cáceres
Seats won	35	20	6
Popular vote	296,939	168,606	47,504
Percentage	53.0%	30.1%	8.5%
	Fourth party
Leader	Manuel Pareja
Party	PCE
Leader since	1983
Leader's seat	Badajoz
Seats won	4
Popular vote	36,294
Percentage	6.5%
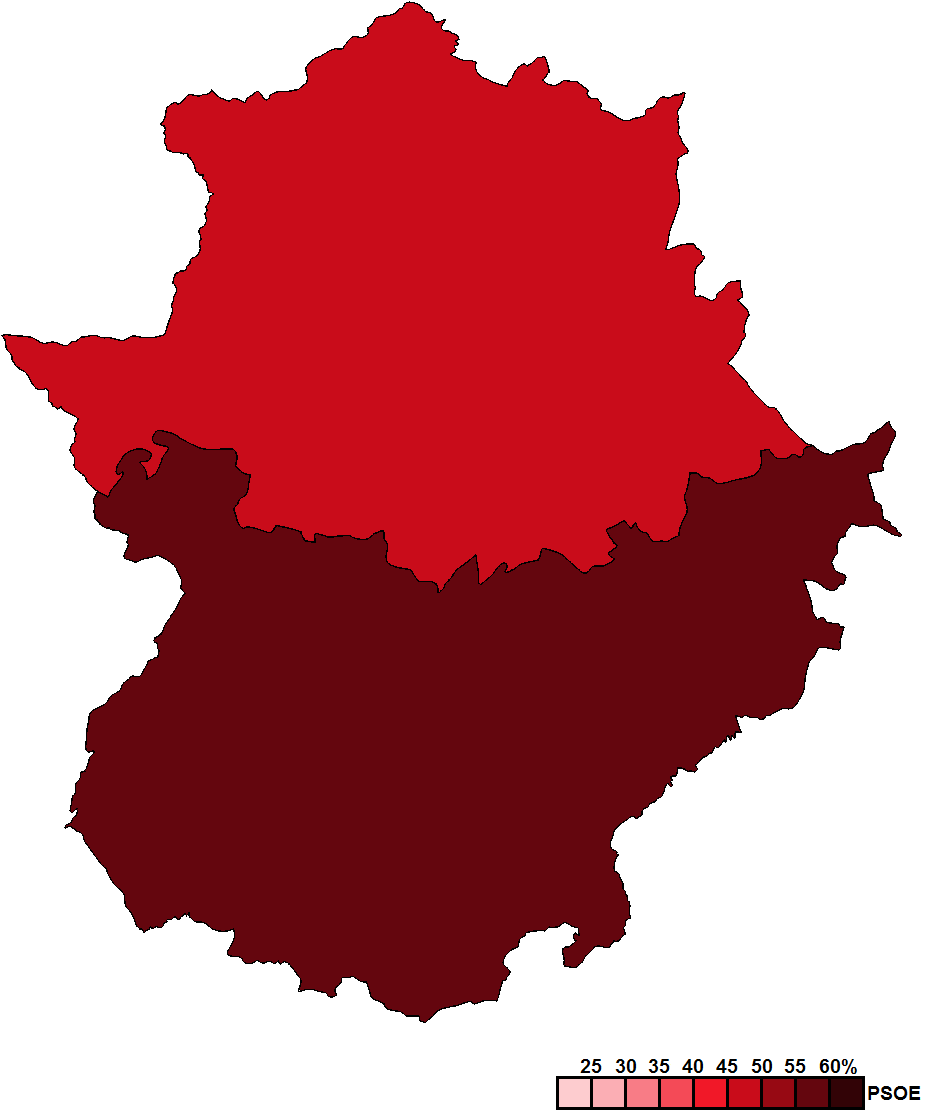
- Constituency results map for the Assembly of Extremadura
President before election
Juan Carlos Rodríguez Ibarra
PSOE
President after election
Juan Carlos Rodríguez Ibarra
PSOE

A regional election was held in Extremadura on 8 May 1983 to elect the 1st Assembly of the autonomous community. All 65 seats in the Assembly were up for election. It was held concurrently with regional elections in twelve other autonomous communities and local elections all across Spain.

The Spanish Socialist Workers' Party (PSOE), under the leadership of pre-autonomic president Juan Carlos Rodríguez Ibarra, won a landslide victory by securing 53% of the share and 36 out of 65 seats. The People's Coalition, the electoral alliance of the People's Alliance (AP), the People's Democratic Party (PDP) and the Liberal Union (UL), emerged as the second largest political force with 30% of the vote and 20 seats, whereas United Extremadura (EU) and the Communist Party of Spain (PCE) entered the Assembly with 6 and 4 seats, respectively.

== Overview ==
Under the 1983 Statute of Autonomy, the Assembly of Extremadura was the unicameral legislature of the homonymous autonomous community, having legislative power in devolved matters, as well as the ability to grant or withdraw confidence from a regional president. The electoral and procedural rules were supplemented by national law provisions (which were those used in the 1977 general election).

=== Date ===
The Regional Government of Extremadura, in agreement with the Government of Spain, was required to call an election to the Assembly before 31 May 1983.

The Assembly of Extremadura could not be dissolved before the expiration date of parliament, except in the event of an investiture process failing to elect a regional president within a two-month period from the first ballot. In such a case, the Assembly was to be automatically dissolved and a snap election called, with elected lawmakers serving the remainder of its original four-year term.

On 7 March 1983, it was confirmed that the first Assembly election would be held on 8 May, together with regional elections for twelve other autonomous communities as well as the regularly scheduled nationwide local elections. The election to the Assembly of Extremadura was officially called on 10 March 1983 with the publication of the corresponding decree in the Official Journal of Extremadura, setting election day for 8 May.

=== Electoral system ===
Voting for the Assembly was based on universal suffrage, comprising all Spanish nationals over 18 years of age, registered in Extremadura and with full political rights.

The Assembly of Extremadura had 65 seats in its first election. All were elected in two multi-member constituencies—corresponding to the provinces of Badajoz and Cáceres, each of which was assigned a fixed number of seats—using the D'Hondt method and closed-list proportional voting, with a three percent-threshold of valid votes (including blank ballots) in each constituency.

As a result of the aforementioned allocation, each Assembly constituency was entitled the following seats:

Seats	Constituencies
35	Badajoz
30	Cáceres

The law did not provide for by-elections to fill vacant seats; instead, any vacancies arising after the proclamation of candidates and during the legislative term were filled by the next candidates on the party lists or, when required, by designated substitutes.

=== Provisional parliament ===
The regional Statute established a provisional composition for the Assembly of Extremadura—to remain in place until an election could be held—which was to be made up of all elected members in the Cortes Generales, as well as by 45 members designated by political parties which had obtained at least three percent of the valid votes cast at the regional level in the 1982 Spanish general election (in proportion to the number of votes obtained). As a result, the composition of the provisional Assembly, upon its constitution in March 1983, was as indicated below:

Parliamentary composition in March 1983
Parties	% of votes	Seats			
Parties	% of votes	C	S	Dis.	Total
PSOE	55.41	9	6	26	41
AP–PDP	23.80	3	2	11	16
UCD	10.06	−	−	5	5
EU	4.35	−	−	2	2
PCE	3.19	−	−	1	1
Total		12	8	45	65

== Parties and candidates ==
The electoral law allowed for parties and federations registered in the interior ministry, alliances and groupings of electors to present lists of candidates. Parties and federations intending to form an alliance were required to inform the relevant electoral commission within 15 days of the election call, whereas groupings of electors needed to secure the signature of at least one permille—and, in any case, 500 signatures—of the electorate in the constituencies for which they sought election, disallowing electors from signing for more than one list.

Below is a list of the main parties and alliances which contested the election:

Candidacy	Parties and alliances	Candidate	Ideology	Gov.	Ref.
PSOE	List: Spanish Socialist Workers' Party (PSOE)	Juan Carlos Rodríguez Ibarra	Social democracy	Yes	
AP–PDP–UL	List: People's Alliance (AP); People's Democratic Party (PDP); Liberal Union (UL)	Adolfo Díaz-Ambrona	Conservatism; Christian democracy	No	
EU	List: United Extremadura (EU)	Pedro Cañada	Regionalism	No	
PCE	List: Communist Party of Spain (PCE)	Manuel Pareja	Eurocommunism	No	

The electoral disaster of the Union of the Democratic Centre (UCD) in the October 1982 general election and the outcome of its extraordinary congress held in December, in which the party's leadership chose to transform the UCD into a christian democratic political force, brought the party to a process of virtual disintegration as many of its remaining members either switched party allegiances, split into new, independent candidacies or left politics altogether. Subsequent attempts to seek electoral allies ahead of the incoming 1983 local and regional elections, mainly the conservative People's Alliance (AP) and the christian democratic People's Democratic Party (PDP), had limited success due to concerns from both AP and UCD over such alliance policy: AP strongly rejected any agreement that implied any sort of global coalition with UCD due to the party's ongoing decomposition, and prospects about a possible PDP–UCD merger did not come into fruition because of the latter's reluctance to dilute its brand within another party. By the time the UCD's executive had voted for the liquidation of the party's mounting debts and its subsequent dissolution on 18 February 1983, electoral alliances with the AP–PDP coalition had only been agreed in some provinces of the Basque Country and Galicia.

Together with AP, the PDP had agreed to maintain their general election alliance—now rebranded as the People's Coalition—for the May local and regional elections, with the inclusion of the Liberal Union (UL), a political party created in January 1983 out of independents from the AP–PDP coalition in an attempt to appeal to former UCD liberal voters. The Coalition had seen its numbers soar from late February as a result of many former members from the UCD's christian democratic wing joining the PDP.

== Results ==
=== Overall ===
Summary of the 8 May 1983 Assembly of Extremadura election results →
Parties and alliances	Popular vote			Seats	
Parties and alliances	Votes	%	±pp	Total	+/−
Spanish Socialist Workers' Party (PSOE)	296,939	53.02	n/a	35	n/a
People's Coalition (AP–PDP–UL)	168,606	30.10	n/a	20	n/a
United Extremadura (EU)	47,504	8.48	n/a	6	n/a
Communist Party of Spain (PCE)	36,294	6.48	n/a	4	n/a
Democratic and Social Centre (CDS)	4,414	0.79	n/a	0	n/a
Extremaduran Popular Bloc (BPEx)	2,249	0.40	n/a	0	n/a
Spanish Communist Workers' Party–Unified Communist Party (PCOE–PCEU)	1,463	0.26	n/a	0	n/a
Blank ballots	2,622	0.47	n/a		
Total	560,091			65	n/a
Valid votes	560,091	99.09	n/a		
Invalid votes	5,153	0.91	n/a		
Votes cast / turnout	565,244	71.90	n/a		
Abstentions	220,956	28.10	n/a		
Registered voters	786,200				

Popular vote
PSOE	53.02%
AP–PDP–UL	30.10%
EU	8.48%
PCE	6.48%
Others	1.45%
Blank ballots	0.47%

Seats
PSOE	53.85%
AP–PDP–UL	30.77%
EU	9.23%
PCE	6.15%

=== Distribution by constituency ===
Constituency	PSOE		CP		EU		PCE	
Constituency	%	S	%	S	%	S	%	S
Badajoz	56.6	20	30.9	11	3.4	1	8.3	3
Cáceres	47.5	15	29.0	9	16.3	5	3.7	1
Total	53.0	35	30.1	20	8.5	6	6.5	4

== Aftermath ==
=== Government formation ===
Investiture; Nomination of Juan Carlos Rodríguez Ibarra (PSOE)
Ballot →	7 June 1983
Required majority →	33 out of 65
Yes: • PSOE (35); • PCE (3)	38 / 65
No: • EU (6)	6 / 65
Abstentions	0 / 65
Absentees: • AP–PDP–UL (20); • PCE (1)	21 / 65

=== 1987 motion of no confidence ===
Motion of no confidence Nomination of Adolfo Díaz-Ambrona (AP)
Ballot →	18 March 1987
Required majority →	33 out of 65
Yes: • AP–PDP–PL (17)	17 / 65
No: • PSOE (33); • EU (1); • Independents (2)	36 / 65
Abstentions: • Independent (1)	1 / 65
Absentees: • PCE (4); • EU (3); • PSOE (2); • AP–PDP–UL (2)	11 / 65

== Bibliography ==
- Real Decreto-ley 20/1977, de 18 de marzo, sobre Normas Electorales (Royal Decree-Law 20/1977). Official State Gazette (in Spanish). 18 March 1977. BOE-A-1977-7445.
- Ley Orgánica 1/1983, de 25 de febrero, de Estatuto de Autonomía de Extremadura (Organic Law 1/1983). Official State Gazette (in Spanish). 25 February 1983 [version as of 26 February 1983]. BOE-A-1983-6190.
- Decreto 5/1983, de 9 de marzo, por el que se convocan elecciones a la Asamblea de Extremadura (PDF) (Decree). Official Journal of Extremadura (in Spanish). 9 March 1983.
