= 1987 Extremaduran regional election =

Election in the Spanish region of Extremadura

- 10 June 1987

All 65 seats in the Assembly of Extremadura 33 seats needed for a majority
- Opinion polls
- Registered: 808,654 ▲2.9%
- Turnout: 601,597 (74.4%) ▲2.5 pp
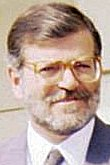

	First party	Second party	Third party
Leader	Juan Carlos Rodríguez Ibarra	Adolfo Díaz-Ambrona	Tomás Martín Tamayo
Party	PSOE	AP	CDS
Leader since	20 December 1982	1976	1983
Leader's seat	Badajoz	Badajoz	Badajoz
Last election	35 seats, 53.0%	20 seats (CP) (Note: Within the AP–PDP–UL alliance in the 1983 election.)	0 seats, 0.8%
Seats won	34	17	8
Seat change	▼1	▼3	▲8
Popular vote	292,935	144,117	73,554
Percentage	49.2%	24.2%	12.4%
Swing	▼3.8 pp	n/a	▲11.6 pp
	Fourth party	Fifth party
Leader	Pedro Cañada	Manuel Pareja
Party	EU	IU
Leader since	10 December 1980	1983
Leader's seat	Cáceres	Badajoz
Last election	6 seats, 8.5%	4 seats, 6.5% (Note: Results for PCE in the 1983 election.)
Seats won	4	2
Seat change	▼2	▼2
Popular vote	34,606	32,240
Percentage	5.8%	5.4%
Swing	▼2.7 pp	▼1.1 pp
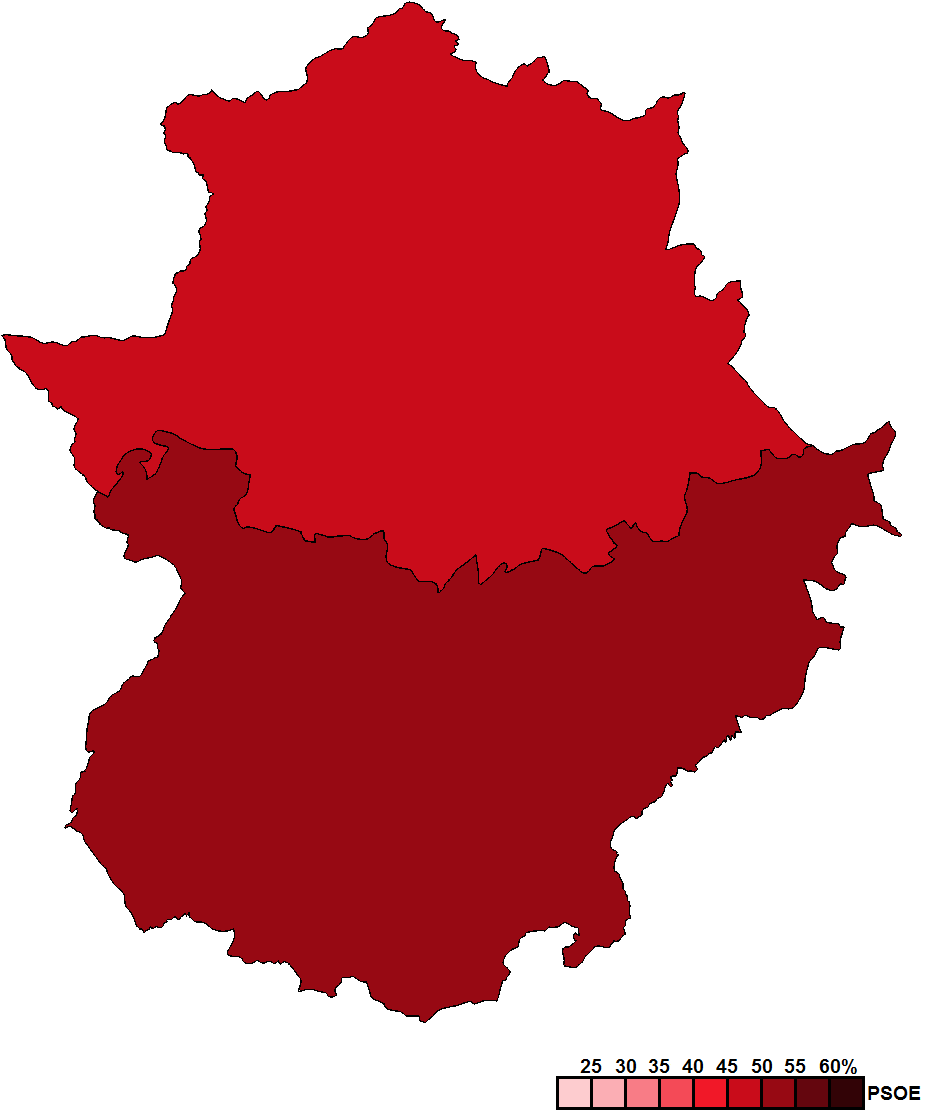
- Constituency results map for the Assembly of Extremadura
President before election
Juan Carlos Rodríguez Ibarra
PSOE
President after election
Juan Carlos Rodríguez Ibarra
PSOE

A regional election was held in Extremadura on 10 June 1987 to elect the 2nd Assembly of the autonomous community. All 65 seats in the Assembly were up for election. It was held concurrently with regional elections in twelve other autonomous communities and local elections all throughout Spain, as well as the 1987 European Parliament election.

The Spanish Socialist Workers' Party (PSOE) won the election with a new absolute majority of seats, albeit losing 1 seat from its 1983 result. The People's Alliance (AP), which had undergone an internal crisis after the breakup of the People's Coalition in 1986, lost support and fell from the coalition's 30% of the share to 24%, losing 3 seats as a result.

The main election winner was the centrist Democratic and Social Centre (CDS), a party led by the former Spanish Prime Minister Adolfo Suarez, which entered the Assembly for the first with 8 seats and 12% of the vote, becoming the only party within the Assembly that made gains, as all others (including regionalist United Extremadura (EU)) lost votes. United Left, an electoral coalition comprising the Communist Party of Spain and other left-wing parties, also lost 2 seats.

== Overview ==
Under the 1983 Statute of Autonomy, the Assembly of Extremadura was the unicameral legislature of the homonymous autonomous community, having legislative power in devolved matters, as well as the ability to grant or withdraw confidence from a regional president. The electoral and procedural rules were supplemented by national law provisions.

=== Date ===
The term of the Assembly of Extremadura expired four years after the date of its previous ordinary election. The election decree was required to be issued no later than 25 days before the scheduled expiration date of parliament and published on the following day in the Official Journal of Extremadura (DOE), with election day taking place between 54 and 60 days after the decree's publication. The previous election was held on 8 May 1983, which meant that the chamber's term would have expired on 8 May 1987. The election decree was required to be published in the DOE no later than 14 April 1987, setting the latest possible date for election day on 13 June 1987.

The Assembly of Extremadura could not be dissolved before the expiration date of parliament, except in the event of an investiture process failing to elect a regional president within a two-month period from the first ballot. In such a case, the Assembly was to be automatically dissolved and a snap election called, with elected lawmakers serving the remainder of its original four-year term.

The election to the Assembly of Extremadura was officially called on 14 April 1987 with the publication of the corresponding decree in the DOE, setting election day for 10 June.

=== Electoral system ===
Voting for the Assembly was based on universal suffrage, comprising all Spanish nationals over 18 years of age, registered in Extremadura and with full political rights, provided that they had not been deprived of the right to vote by a final sentence, nor were legally incapacitated.

The Assembly of Extremadura had a maximum of 65 seats, with electoral provisions fixing its size at that number. All were elected in two multi-member constituencies—corresponding to the provinces of Badajoz and Cáceres, each of which was assigned an initial minimum of 20 seats and the remaining 25 distributed in proportion to population—using the D'Hondt method and closed-list proportional voting, with a five percent-threshold of valid votes (including blank ballots) in each constituency. Alternatively, parties could also enter the seat distribution as long as they ran candidates in both constituencies and reached five percent regionally.

As a result of the aforementioned allocation, each Assembly constituency was entitled the following seats:

Seats	Constituencies
35	Badajoz
30	Cáceres

The law did not provide for by-elections to fill vacant seats; instead, any vacancies arising after the proclamation of candidates and during the legislative term were filled by the next candidates on the party lists or, when required, by designated substitutes.

== Parties and candidates ==
The electoral law allowed for parties and federations registered in the interior ministry, alliances and groupings of electors to present lists of candidates. Parties and federations intending to form an alliance were required to inform the relevant electoral commission within 10 days of the election call, whereas groupings of electors needed to secure the signature of at least two percent of the electorate in the constituencies for which they sought election, disallowing electors from signing for more than one list.

Below is a list of the main parties and alliances which contested the election:

Candidacy	Parties and alliances	Candidate	Ideology	Previous result		Gov.	Ref.
Candidacy	Parties and alliances	Candidate	Ideology	Vote %	Seats	Gov.	Ref.
PSOE	List: Spanish Socialist Workers' Party (PSOE)	Juan Carlos Rodríguez Ibarra	Social democracy	53.0%	35	Yes	
AP	List: People's Alliance (AP)	Adolfo Díaz-Ambrona	Conservatism; National conservatism	30.1%	20	No	
PDP	List: People's Democratic Party (PDP)	Manuel Pérez Pérez	Christian democracy	30.1%	20	No	
PL	List: Liberal Party (PL)	Miguel Martínez Hidalgo	Classical liberalism Conservative liberalism	30.1%	20	No	
EU	List: United Extremadura (EU)	Pedro Cañada	Regionalism; Conservatism	8.5%	6	No	
IU	List: Communist Party of Extremadura (PCEx); Socialist Action Party (PASOC); Communist Party of the Peoples of Spain (PCPE); Progressive Federation (FP); Republican Left (IR)	Manuel Pareja	Socialism; Communism	6.5%	4	No	
CDS	List: Democratic and Social Centre (CDS)	Tomás Martín Tamayo	Centrism; Liberalism	0.8%	0	No	

== Opinion polls ==
The tables below list opinion polling results in reverse chronological order, showing the most recent first and using the dates when the survey fieldwork was done, as opposed to the date of publication. Where the fieldwork dates are unknown, the date of publication is given instead. The highest percentage figure in each polling survey is displayed with its background shaded in the leading party's colour. If a tie ensues, this is applied to the figures with the highest percentages. The "Lead" column on the right shows the percentage-point difference between the parties with the highest percentages in a poll.

=== Voting intention estimates ===
The table below lists weighted voting intention estimates. Refusals are generally excluded from the party vote percentages, while question wording and the treatment of "don't know" responses and those not intending to vote may vary between polling organisations. When available, seat projections determined by the polling organisations are displayed below (or in place of) the percentages in a smaller font; 33 seats were required for an absolute majority in the Assembly of Extremadura.

Polling firm/Commissioner	Fieldwork date	Sample size	Turnout	PSOE	AP–PDP–PL	EU	IU	CDS	AP	Lead
1987 regional election	10 Jun 1987	—N/a	74.4	49.2; 34	–	5.8; 4	5.4; 2	12.4; 8	24.2; 17	25.0
Demoscopia/El País (Note: "Los socialistas mantienen la hegemonía" (PDF). El País (in Spanish). 4 June 1987. Archived from the original on 12 March 2017.)	22–26 May 1987	?	73	49.1; 35	–	7.2; 6	3.4; 1	9.7; 6	27.5; 17	21.6
Sofemasa/AP	16 Apr 1987	?	?	43.5	–	–	4.8	14.5	24.1	19.4
1986 general election	22 Jun 1986	—N/a	73.6	55.9 (39)	26.7 (19)	2.7 (1)	3.9 (1)	8.0 (5)	(Note: Within CP.)	29.2
1983 regional election	8 May 1983	—N/a	71.9	53.0; 36	30.1; 20	8.5; 6	6.5; 4	0.8; 0		22.9

=== Voting preferences ===
The table below lists raw, unweighted voting preferences.

Polling firm/Commissioner	Fieldwork date	Sample size	PSOE	AP–PDP–PL	EU	IU	CDS	AP	PDP	Question	X mark	Lead
1987 regional election (Note: Does not include non-resident citizens.)	10 Jun 1987	—N/a	36.2	–	4.3	4.0	9.1	17.8	0.6	—N/a	25.6	18.4
CIS	2–5 Jun 1987	998	34.6	–	4.0	3.1	7.3	12.5	0.2	32.6	4.7	22.1
CIS	8–16 May 1987	1,781	35.2	–	4.1	3.0	5.8	9.7	0.3	37.8	3.6	25.5
CIS	12–21 Apr 1987	1,800	33.0	–	5.0	3.0	5.0	9.0	0.0	40.0	4.0	24.0
CIS	14–23 Mar 1987	2,396	35.0	–	4.0	2.0	5.0	13.0	0.0	37.0	3.0	22.0
CIS	1 Sep 1986	1,991	34.3	–	2.1	2.4	5.4	11.6	0.4	34.6	6.0	22.7
1986 general election	22 Jun 1986	—N/a	40.8	19.5	1.9	2.8	5.9			—N/a	26.1	21.3
CIS	1 Feb 1986	1,988	34.4	10.2	3.6	2.6	2.4			39.2	6.8	24.2
CIS	1 Sep 1985	1,979	29.5	11.6	3.7	1.9	2.1			42.2	8.4	17.9
CIS	28 Feb–15 Mar 1985	1,958	33.3	11.5	6.8	3.0	1.6			37.9	5.4	21.8
1983 regional election	8 May 1983	—N/a	37.8	21.4	6.0	4.6	0.6			—N/a	28.1	16.4

=== Victory preferences ===
The table below lists opinion polling on the victory preferences for each party in the event of a regional election taking place.

Polling firm/Commissioner	Fieldwork date	Sample size	PSOE	EU	IU	CDS	AP	PDP	Other/ None	Question	Lead
CIS	2–5 Jun 1987	998	42.2	5.8	3.2	9.0	13.8	0.1	1.7	24.1	28.4
CIS	8–16 May 1987	1,781	43.5	4.7	3.7	6.7	11.8	0.6	0.6	28.4	31.7
CIS	12–21 Apr 1987	1,800	40.0	6.0	3.0	7.0	12.0	0.0	2.0	32.0	28.0
CIS	14–23 Mar 1987	2,396	39.0	4.0	2.0	7.0	15.0	0.0	1.0	33.0	24.0

=== Victory likelihood ===
The table below lists opinion polling on the perceived likelihood of victory for each party in the event of a regional election taking place.

Polling firm/Commissioner	Fieldwork date	Sample size	PSOE	EU	IU	CDS	AP	Other/ None	Question	Lead
CIS	2–5 Jun 1987	998	58.5	0.6	1.3	4.1	4.2	0.4	31.0	54.8
CIS	8–16 May 1987	1,781	57.8	0.4	0.6	2.0	3.0	0.1	36.2	54.8
CIS	12–21 Apr 1987	1,800	58.0	1.0	0.0	1.0	3.0	0.0	36.0	55.0
CIS	14–23 Mar 1987	2,396	51.0	1.0	0.0	2.0	4.0	0.0	42.0	47.0

=== Preferred President ===
The table below lists opinion polling on leader preferences to become president of the Regional Government of Extremadura.

Polling firm/Commissioner	Fieldwork date	Sample size							Other/ None/ Not care	Question	Lead
Polling firm/Commissioner	Fieldwork date	Sample size	Ibarra PSOE	Ambrona AP	Cañada EU	Parejo IU	Martín CDS	Pérez PDP	Other/ None/ Not care	Question	Lead
CIS	2–5 Jun 1987	998	34.3	10.2	5.8	0.5	3.8	0.7	12.2	32.5	24.1
CIS	8–16 May 1987	1,781	30.5	7.0	4.5	1.0	1.7	0.8	15.7	38.8	23.5
CIS	12–21 Apr 1987	1,800	28.0	5.0	6.0	1.0	2.0	1.0	19.0	39.0	22.0
CIS	14–23 Mar 1987	2,396	28.0	9.0	5.0	1.0	1.0	–	14.0	41.0	19.0

== Results ==
=== Overall ===
← Summary of the 10 June 1987 Assembly of Extremadura election results →
Parties and alliances	Popular vote			Seats	
Parties and alliances	Votes	%	±pp	Total	+/−
Spanish Socialist Workers' Party (PSOE)	292,935	49.18	−3.84	34	−1
People's Alliance (AP)^{1}	144,117	24.19	n/a	17	−3
Democratic and Social Centre (CDS)	73,554	12.35	+11.56	8	+8
United Extremadura (EU)	34,606	5.81	−2.67	4	−2
United Left (IU)^{2}	32,240	5.41	−1.07	2	−2
Workers' Party of Spain–Communist Unity (PTE–UC)	5,317	0.89	New	0	±0
People's Democratic Party (PDP)^{1}	5,203	0.87	n/a	0	±0
Liberal Party (PL)^{1}	2,286	0.38	n/a	0	±0
Humanist Platform (PH)	619	0.10	New	0	±0
Blank ballots	4,785	0.80	+0.33		
Total	595,662			65	±0
Valid votes	595,662	99.01	−0.08		
Invalid votes	5,935	0.99	+0.08		
Votes cast / turnout	601,597	74.39	+2.49		
Abstentions	207,057	25.61	−2.49		
Registered voters	808,654				
Sources
Footnotes: ^{1} Within the People's Coalition alliance in the 1983 election.; ^{2} United Left results are compared to Communist Party of Spain totals in the 1983 election.

Popular vote
PSOE	49.18%
AP	24.19%
CDS	12.35%
EU	5.81%
IU	5.41%
Others	2.25%
Blank ballots	0.80%

Seats
PSOE	52.31%
AP	26.15%
CDS	12.31%
EU	6.15%
IU	3.08%

=== Distribution by constituency ===
Constituency	PSOE		AP		CDS		EU		IU	
Constituency	%	S	%	S	%	S	%	S	%	S
Badajoz	51.9	19	23.8	9	13.2	5	1.6	−	7.0	2
Cáceres	45.1	15	24.9	8	11.1	3	12.2	4	3.0	−
Total	49.2	34	24.2	17	12.4	8	5.8	4	5.4	2

== Aftermath ==
=== Government formation ===
Investiture; Nomination of Juan Carlos Rodríguez Ibarra (PSOE)
Ballot →	17 July 1987
Required majority →	33 out of 65
Yes: • PSOE (34)	34 / 65
No: • AP (14); • IU (2)	16 / 65
Abstentions: • CDS (8); • EU (4)	12 / 65
Absentees: • AP (3)	3 / 65

== Bibliography ==
- Ley Orgánica 1/1983, de 25 de febrero, de Estatuto de Autonomía de Extremadura (Organic Law 1/1983). Official State Gazette (in Spanish). 25 February 1983 [version as of 26 February 1983]. BOE-A-1983-6190.
- Ley 2/1984, de 7 de junio, del Gobierno y de la Administración de la Comunidad Autónoma de Extremadura (Law 2/1984). Official State Gazette (in Spanish). 7 June 1984. BOE-A-1984-17656.
- Ley Orgánica 5/1985, de 19 de junio, del Régimen Electoral General (Organic Law 5/1985). Official State Gazette (in Spanish). 19 June 1985 [version as of 3 April 1987]. BOE-A-1985-11672.
- Ley 2/1987, de 16 de marzo, de Elecciones a la Asamblea de Extremadura (Law 2/1987). Official State Gazette (in Spanish). 16 March 1987 [version as of 16 March 1987]. BOE-A-1987-8817.
- Decreto del Presidente, de 13 de abril de 1987, por el que se convocan elecciones a la Asamblea de Extremadura (PDF) (Decree). Official Journal of Extremadura (in Spanish). 13 April 1987.
