= 1991 Extremaduran regional election =

Election in the Spanish region of Extremadura

- 26 May 1991

All 65 seats in the Assembly of Extremadura 33 seats needed for a majority
- Opinion polls
- Registered: 824,866 ▲2.0%
- Turnout: 583,172 (70.8%) ▼3.6 pp
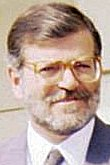

	First party	Second party	Third party
Leader	Juan Carlos Rodríguez Ibarra	Vicente Sánchez Cuadrado	Manuel Pareja
Party	PSOE	PP	IU
Leader since	20 December 1982	1991	1983
Leader's seat	Badajoz	Badajoz	Badajoz
Last election	34 seats, 49.2%	17 seats, 25.4% (Note: Results for AP (24.2%, 17 seats), PDP (0.9%, 0 seats) and PL (0.4%, 0 seats) in the 1987 election.)	2 seats, 5.4%
Seats won	39	19	4
Seat change	▲5	▲2	▲2
Popular vote	314,384	155,485	41,290
Percentage	54.2%	26.8%	7.1%
Swing	▲5.0 pp	▲1.4 pp	▲1.7 pp
	Fourth party	Fifth party
Leader	Tomás Martín Tamayo	Pedro Cañada
Party	CDS	EU
Leader since	1983	10 December 1980
Leader's seat	Badajoz	Cáceres (lost)
Last election	8 seats, 12.4%	4 seats, 5.8%
Seats won	3	0
Seat change	▼5	▼4
Popular vote	33,291	14,503
Percentage	5.7%	2.5%
Swing	▼6.7 pp	▼3.3 pp
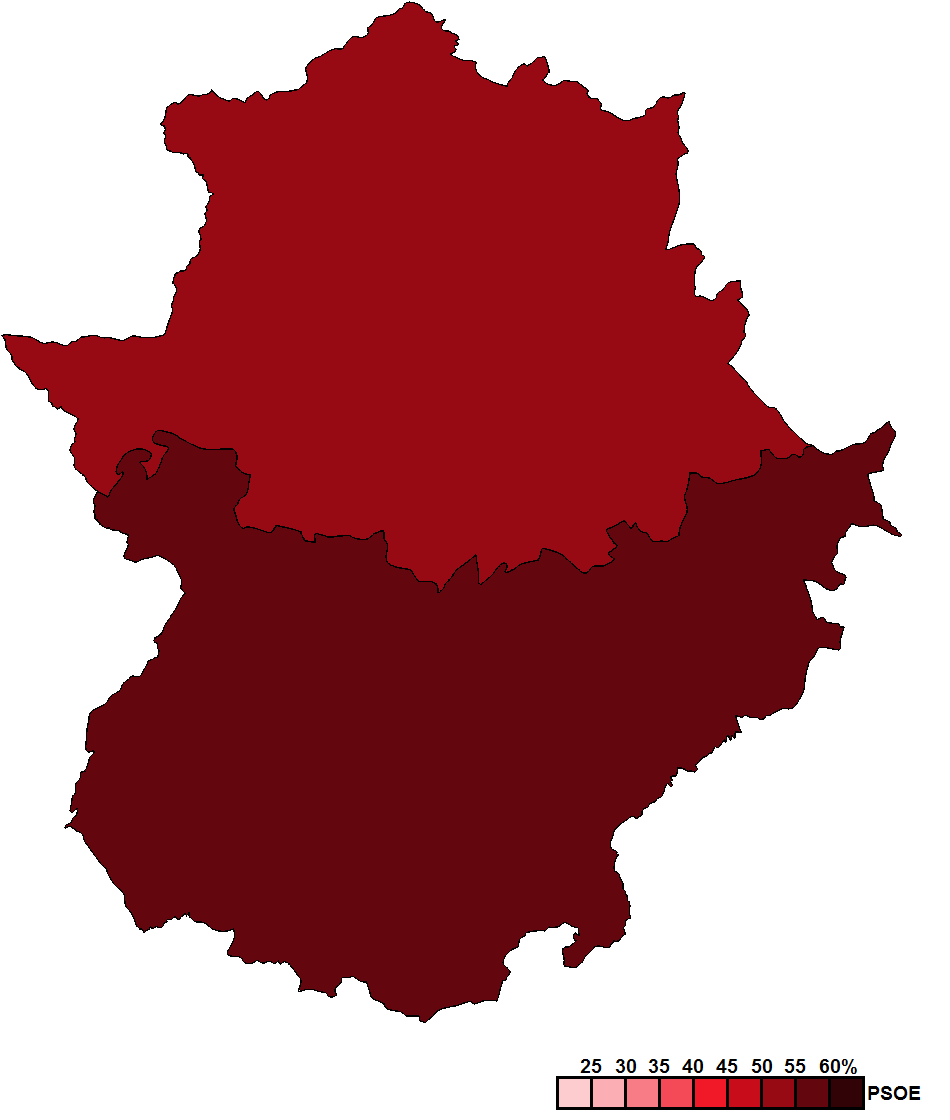
- Constituency results map for the Assembly of Extremadura
President before election
Juan Carlos Rodríguez Ibarra
PSOE
President after election
Juan Carlos Rodríguez Ibarra
PSOE

A regional election was held in Extremadura on 26 May 1991 to elect the 3rd Assembly of the autonomous community. All 65 seats in the Assembly were up for election. It was held concurrently with regional elections in twelve other autonomous communities and local elections all across Spain.

The Spanish Socialist Workers' Party (PSOE) won the largest absolute majority a party would achieve in a regional election in the history of Extremadura, with 39 out of 65 seats (60% of the seats) and slightly above 54% of the vote share. The newly founded People's Party, successor of the late People's Alliance, recovered from AP 1987 results and gained two seats. The Democratic and Social Centre lost seats and votes, falling behind United Left (IU), which gained support and finished in third place for the first time in a regional election. Meanwhile, the regionalist United Extremadura (EU) lost more than half its support and was left out from the Assembly, losing all its seats.

As a result of the election, Juan Carlos Rodríguez Ibarra was elected for a third consecutive term in office.

== Overview ==
Under the 1983 Statute of Autonomy, the Assembly of Extremadura was the unicameral legislature of the homonymous autonomous community, having legislative power in devolved matters, as well as the ability to grant or withdraw confidence from a regional president. The electoral and procedural rules were supplemented by national law provisions.

=== Date ===
The term of the Assembly of Extremadura expired four years after the date of its previous ordinary election, with amendments earlier in 1991 fixing election day for the fourth Sunday of May every four years. The election decree was required to be issued between 54 and 60 days before the scheduled election date and published on the following day in the Official Journal of Extremadura (DOE). The previous election was held on 10 June 1987, setting the date for election day on the fourth Sunday of May four years later, which was 26 May 1991.

The Assembly of Extremadura could not be dissolved before the expiration date of parliament, except in the event of an investiture process failing to elect a regional president within a two-month period from the first ballot. In such a case, the Assembly was to be automatically dissolved and a snap election called, with elected lawmakers serving the remainder of its original four-year term.

The election to the Assembly of Extremadura was officially called on 2 April 1991 with the publication of the corresponding decree in the DOE, setting election day for 26 May.

=== Electoral system ===
Voting for the Assembly was based on universal suffrage, comprising all Spanish nationals over 18 years of age, registered in Extremadura and with full political rights, provided that they had not been deprived of the right to vote by a final sentence, nor were legally incapacitated.

The Assembly of Extremadura had a maximum of 65 seats, with electoral provisions fixing its size at that number. All were elected in two multi-member constituencies—corresponding to the provinces of Badajoz and Cáceres, each of which was assigned an initial minimum of 20 seats and the remaining 25 distributed in proportion to population—using the D'Hondt method and closed-list proportional voting, with a five percent-threshold of valid votes (including blank ballots) in each constituency. Alternatively, parties could also enter the seat distribution as long as they ran candidates in both constituencies and reached five percent regionally.

As a result of the aforementioned allocation, each Assembly constituency was entitled the following seats:

Seats	Constituencies
35	Badajoz
30	Cáceres

The law did not provide for by-elections to fill vacant seats; instead, any vacancies arising after the proclamation of candidates and during the legislative term were filled by the next candidates on the party lists or, when required, by designated substitutes.

=== Outgoing parliament ===
The table below shows the composition of the parliamentary groups in the chamber at the time of the election call.

Parliamentary composition in April 1991
Groups	Parties	Legislators	
Groups	Parties	Seats	Total
Socialist Parliamentary Group	PSOE	34	34
People's Parliamentary Group	PP	17	17
CDS Parliamentary Group	CDS	8	8
Mixed Parliamentary Group	EU	2	6
Mixed Parliamentary Group	IU	2	6
Mixed Parliamentary Group	PREx	2 (Note: Victoriano Durán and José María Rodríguez, former EU legislators.)	6

== Parties and candidates ==
The electoral law allowed for parties and federations registered in the interior ministry, alliances and groupings of electors to present lists of candidates. Parties and federations intending to form an alliance were required to inform the relevant electoral commission within 10 days of the election call, whereas groupings of electors needed to secure the signature of at least two percent of the electorate in the constituencies for which they sought election, disallowing electors from signing for more than one list.

Below is a list of the main parties and alliances which contested the election:

Candidacy	Parties and alliances	Candidate	Ideology	Previous result		Gov.	Ref.
Candidacy	Parties and alliances	Candidate	Ideology	Vote %	Seats	Gov.	Ref.
PSOE	List: Spanish Socialist Workers' Party (PSOE)	Juan Carlos Rodríguez Ibarra	Social democracy	49.2%	34	Yes	
PP	List: People's Party (PP)	Vicente Sánchez Cuadrado	Conservatism; Christian democracy	25.4%	17	No	
CDS	List: Democratic and Social Centre (CDS)	Tomás Martín Tamayo	Centrism; Liberalism	12.4%	8	No	
EU	List: United Extremadura (EU)	Pedro Cañada	Regionalism; Conservatism	5.8%	4	No	
IU	List: Communist Party of Extremadura (PCEx); Socialist Action Party (PASOC); Republican Left (IR)	Manuel Pareja	Socialism; Communism	5.4%	2	No	

== Opinion polls ==
The tables below list opinion polling results in reverse chronological order, showing the most recent first and using the dates when the survey fieldwork was done, as opposed to the date of publication. Where the fieldwork dates are unknown, the date of publication is given instead. The highest percentage figure in each polling survey is displayed with its background shaded in the leading party's colour. If a tie ensues, this is applied to the figures with the highest percentages. The "Lead" column on the right shows the percentage-point difference between the parties with the highest percentages in a poll.

=== Voting intention estimates ===
The table below lists weighted voting intention estimates. Refusals are generally excluded from the party vote percentages, while question wording and the treatment of "don't know" responses and those not intending to vote may vary between polling organisations. When available, seat projections determined by the polling organisations are displayed below (or in place of) the percentages in a smaller font; 33 seats were required for an absolute majority in the Assembly of Extremadura.

Polling firm/Commissioner	Fieldwork date	Sample size	Turnout	PSOE	AP	CDS	EU	IU	PP	Lead
1991 regional election	26 May 1991	—N/a	70.8	54.2; 39	(Note: Within PP.)	5.7; 3	2.5; 0	7.1; 4	26.8; 19	27.4
Sigma Dos/El Mundo	18 May 1991	?	?	53.4; 38/39		5.3; 2/3	–	8.8; 5/7	25.4; 18/19	28.0
Metra Seis/El Independiente	12 May 1991	?	?	47.0; 35		6.7; 4	8.7; 6	5.8; 2	25.5; 18	21.5
Demoscopia/El País	4–7 May 1991	400	?	53.3; 36/37		5.3; 3	6.1; 3/4	8.6; 4	25.0; 18	28.3
1989 general election	29 Oct 1989	—N/a	75.6	53.9 (37)		9.5 (6)	1.8 (0)	6.9 (4)	25.0 (18)	28.9
1989 EP election	15 Jun 1989	—N/a	60.4	54.8 (41)		8.6 (5)	2.3 (0)	4.9 (3)	21.8 (16)	33.0
1987 regional election	10 Jun 1987	—N/a	74.4	49.2; 34	24.2; 17	12.4; 8	5.8; 4	5.4; 2	–	25.0

=== Voting preferences ===
The table below lists raw, unweighted voting preferences.

Polling firm/Commissioner	Fieldwork date	Sample size	PSOE	AP	CDS	EU	IU	PP	Question	X mark	Lead
1991 regional election (Note: Does not include non-resident citizens.)	26 May 1991	—N/a	38.0		4.0	1.7	5.0	18.8	—N/a	29.0	19.2
ICP–Research/Diario 16	19 May 1991	?	48.5		3.3	–	3.0	22.6	–	–	25.9
CIS	13–25 Mar 1991	1,058	49.0		3.0	3.0	5.0	10.0	26.0	4.0	39.0
CIS	4–17 Feb 1991	1,576	49.5		2.7	4.0	4.8	10.5	22.6	5.2	39.0
CIS	15–29 Dec 1990	1,721	47.8		2.3	3.4	7.3	12.0	18.1	7.9	35.8
CIS	24 May–2 Jun 1990	1,000	42.1		3.0	3.4	7.5	12.5	25.5	4.8	29.6
1989 general election	29 Oct 1989	—N/a	40.5		7.2	1.3	5.2	18.8	—N/a	24.3	21.7
CIS	20–29 Jul 1989	1,000	44.9		7.3	3.6	4.2	8.3	22.8	8.0	36.6
1989 EP election	15 Jun 1989	—N/a	32.8		5.2	1.4	2.9	13.0	—N/a	39.5	19.8
CIS	18–28 Dec 1988	999	37.2	9.6	6.5	5.9	3.9	–	27.5	8.7	27.6
1987 regional election	10 Jun 1987	—N/a	36.2	17.8	9.1	4.3	4.0	–	—N/a	25.6	18.4

=== Victory preferences ===
The table below lists opinion polling on the victory preferences for each party in the event of a regional election taking place.

Polling firm/Commissioner	Fieldwork date	Sample size	PSOE	CDS	EU	IU	PP	Other/ None	Question	Lead
CIS	13–25 Mar 1991	1,058	54.0	3.0	4.0	5.0	11.0	17.0	5.0	43.0
CIS	4–17 Feb 1991	1,576	51.0	2.7	3.7	5.5	11.6	19.6	5.7	39.4

== Results ==
=== Overall ===
← Summary of the 26 May 1991 Assembly of Extremadura election results →
Parties and alliances	Popular vote			Seats	
Parties and alliances	Votes	%	±pp	Total	+/−
Spanish Socialist Workers' Party (PSOE)	314,384	54.16	+4.98	39	+5
People's Party (PP)^{1}	155,485	26.78	+1.34	19	+2
United Left (IU)	41,290	7.11	+1.70	4	+2
Democratic and Social Centre (CDS)	33,291	5.73	−6.62	3	−5
United Extremadura (EU)	14,503	2.50	−3.31	0	−4
Extremaduran Regionalist Party (PREx)	8,660	1.49	New	0	±0
The Greens (LV)	6,011	1.04	New	0	±0
Communist Party of the Peoples of Spain (PCPE)	2,379	0.41	New	0	±0
Blank ballots	4,508	0.78	−0.02		
Total	580,511			65	±0
Valid votes	580,511	99.34	+0.33		
Invalid votes	3,867	0.66	−0.33		
Votes cast / turnout	584,378	70.85	−3.54		
Abstentions	240,488	29.15	+3.54		
Registered voters	824,866				
Sources
Footnotes: ^{1} People's Party results are compared to the combined totals of People's Alliance and People's Democratic Party in the 1987 election.

Popular vote
PSOE	54.15%
PP	26.76%
IU	7.13%
CDS	5.75%
EU	2.50%
PREx	1.49%
LV	1.01%
PCPE	0.41%
Blank ballots	0.80%

Seats
PSOE	60.00%
PP	29.23%
IU	6.15%
CDS	4.62%

=== Distribution by constituency ===
Constituency	PSOE		PP		IU		CDS	
Constituency	%	S	%	S	%	S	%	S
Badajoz	56.3	21	25.1	9	8.7	3	5.9	2
Cáceres	50.9	18	29.3	10	4.8	1	5.5	1
Total	54.2	39	26.8	19	7.1	4	5.7	3

== Aftermath ==
=== Government formation ===
Investiture; Nomination of Juan Carlos Rodríguez Ibarra (PSOE)
Ballot →	2 July 1991
Required majority →	33 out of 65
Yes: • PSOE (39)	39 / 65
No: • PP (19); • IU (4)	23 / 65
Abstentions	0 / 65
Absentees: • CDS (3)	3 / 65

== Bibliography ==
- Ley Orgánica 1/1983, de 25 de febrero, de Estatuto de Autonomía de Extremadura (Organic Law 1/1983). Official State Gazette (in Spanish). 25 February 1983 [version as of 14 March 1991]. BOE-A-1983-6190.
- Ley 2/1984, de 7 de junio, del Gobierno y de la Administración de la Comunidad Autónoma de Extremadura (Law 2/1984). Official State Gazette (in Spanish). 7 June 1984. BOE-A-1984-17656.
- Ley Orgánica 5/1985, de 19 de junio, del Régimen Electoral General (Organic Law 5/1985). Official State Gazette (in Spanish). 19 June 1985 [version as of 14 March 1991]. BOE-A-1985-11672.
- Ley 2/1987, de 16 de marzo, de Elecciones a la Asamblea de Extremadura (Law 2/1987). Official State Gazette (in Spanish). 16 March 1987 [version as of 26 March 1991]. BOE-A-1987-8817.
- Decreto del Presidente 7/1991, de 1 de abril, por el que se convocan Elecciones a la Asamblea de Extremadura (PDF) (Decree 7/1991). Official Journal of Extremadura (in Spanish). 1 April 1991.
