= 1995 Spanish local elections in Extremadura =

This article presents the results breakdown of the local elections held in Extremadura on 28 May 1995. The following tables show detailed results in the autonomous community's most populous municipalities, sorted alphabetically.

== City control ==
The following table lists party control in the most populous municipalities, including provincial capitals (highlighted in bold). Gains for a party are highlighted in that party's colour.

Municipality	Population	Previous control	New control
Almendralejo	26,587	Spanish Socialist Workers' Party (PSOE)	People's Party (PP)
**Badajoz**	130,153	Spanish Socialist Workers' Party (PSOE)	People's Party (PP)
**Cáceres**	80,235	Spanish Socialist Workers' Party (PSOE)	People's Party (PP)
Mérida	51,968	Spanish Socialist Workers' Party (PSOE)	People's Party (PP)
Plasencia	37,554	Spanish Socialist Workers' Party (PSOE)	People's Party (PP)

== Municipalities ==
=== Almendralejo ===
Population: 26,587

← Summary of the 28 May 1995 City Council of Almendralejo election results →
Parties and alliances	Popular vote			Seats	
Parties and alliances	Votes	%	±pp	Total	+/−
People's Party (PP)	5,837	37.50	+9.85	**8**	+2
Spanish Socialist Workers' Party (PSOE)	5,652	36.31	−14.50	**8**	−3
Extremaduran Coalition (CEx)^{1}	2,573	16.53	+10.21	**3**	+2
United Left–The Greens–Commitment to Extremadura (IU–LV–CE)	1,313	8.44	+2.73	**2**	+1
Democratic and Social Centre (CDS)	n/a	n/a	−8.69	0	−2
Blank ballots	191	1.23	+0.41		
**Total**	**15,566**			**21**	**±0**
Valid votes	15,566	99.39	+0.27		
Invalid votes	95	0.61	−0.27		
**Votes cast / turnout**	**15,661**	**78.14**	**+4.23**		
Abstentions	4,382	26.09	−4.23		
**Registered voters**	**20,043**				
Sources
Footnotes: ^{1} Extremaduran Coalition results are compared to Extremaduran Regionalist Party totals in the 1991 election.

=== Badajoz ===
Population: 130,153

← Summary of the 28 May 1995 City Council of Badajoz election results →
Parties and alliances	Popular vote			Seats	
Parties and alliances	Votes	%	±pp	Total	+/−
People's Party (PP)	37,751	53.53	+19.87	**16**	+6
Spanish Socialist Workers' Party (PSOE)	20,401	28.93	−22.11	**8**	−7
United Left–The Greens–Commitment to Extremadura (IU–LV–CE)	9,426	13.37	+5.91	**3**	+1
Extremaduran Coalition (CEx)^{1}	1,999	2.83	+1.02	0	±0
Independent Spanish Phalanx (FEI)	86	0.12	New	0	±0
Blank ballots	855	1.21	+0.05		
**Total**	**70,518**			**27**	**±0**
Valid votes	70,518	99.50	+0.21		
Invalid votes	354	0.50	−0.21		
**Votes cast / turnout**	**70,872**	**72.27**	**+14.67**		
Abstentions	27,200	27.73	−14.67		
**Registered voters**	**98,072**				
Sources
Footnotes: ^{1} Extremaduran Coalition results are compared to United Extremadura totals in the 1991 election.

=== Cáceres ===
Population: 80,235

← Summary of the 28 May 1995 City Council of Cáceres election results →
Parties and alliances	Popular vote			Seats	
Parties and alliances	Votes	%	±pp	Total	+/−
People's Party (PP)	24,859	56.32	+16.88	**15**	+3
Spanish Socialist Workers' Party (PSOE)	12,045	27.29	−11.28	**7**	−5
United Left–The Greens–Commitment to Extremadura (IU–LV–CE)	4,685	10.62	+5.67	**3**	+3
Extremaduran Coalition (CEx)^{1}	1,918	4.35	−3.05	0	−1
Blank ballots	628	1.42	+0.24		
**Total**	**44,135**			**25**	**±0**
Valid votes	44,135	99.47	+0.12		
Invalid votes	237	0.53	−0.12		
**Votes cast / turnout**	**44,372**	**71.78**	**+10.64**		
Abstentions	17,447	28.22	−10.64		
**Registered voters**	**61,819**				
Sources
Footnotes: ^{1} Extremaduran Coalition results are compared to the combined totals of United Extremadura and Extremaduran Regionalist Party in the 1991 election.

=== Mérida ===
Population: 51,968

← Summary of the 28 May 1995 City Council of Mérida election results →
Parties and alliances	Popular vote			Seats	
Parties and alliances	Votes	%	±pp	Total	+/−
People's Party (PP)	10,900	39.91	+17.43	**10**	+4
Spanish Socialist Workers' Party (PSOE)	9,057	33.16	−19.00	**9**	−6
United Left–The Greens–Commitment to Extremadura (IU–LV–CE)	6,471	23.69	+7.70	**6**	+2
Extremaduran Coalition (CEx)^{1}	421	1.54	−0.94	0	±0
Independent Socialists of Extremadura (SIEx)	140	0.51	New	0	±0
Blank ballots	322	1.18	+0.23		
**Total**	**27,311**			**25**	**±0**
Valid votes	27,311	99.31	+0.14		
Invalid votes	191	0.69	−0.14		
**Votes cast / turnout**	**27,502**	**71.43**	**+11.97**		
Abstentions	10,998	28.57	−11.97		
**Registered voters**	**38,500**				
Sources
Footnotes: ^{1} Extremaduran Coalition results are compared to the combined totals of Extremaduran Regionalist Party and United Extremadura in the 1991 election.

=== Plasencia ===
Population: 37,554

← Summary of the 28 May 1995 City Council of Plasencia election results →
Parties and alliances	Popular vote			Seats	
Parties and alliances	Votes	%	±pp	Total	+/−
People's Party (PP)	9,228	45.93	+28.77	**10**	+6
Spanish Socialist Workers' Party (PSOE)	6,355	31.63	−9.37	**7**	−4
Extremaduran Coalition (CEx)^{1}	2,710	13.49	+6.44	**3**	+3
United Left–The Greens–Commitment to Extremadura (IU–LV–CE)	1,271	6.33	+0.41	**1**	±0
Independent Socialists of Extremadura (SIEx)	207	1.03	New	0	±0
Democratic and Social Centre (CDS)	n/a	n/a	−21.06	0	−5
Blank ballots	320	1.59	+0.36		
**Total**	**20,091**			**21**	**±0**
Valid votes	20,091	99.34	−0.20		
Invalid votes	134	0.66	+0.20		
**Votes cast / turnout**	**20,225**	**82.95**	**+19.01**		
Abstentions	4,156	17.05	−19.01		
**Registered voters**	**24,381**				
Sources
Footnotes: ^{1} Extremaduran Coalition results are compared to the combined totals of United Extremadura and Extremaduran Regionalist Party in the 1991 election.

== See also ==
- 1995 Extremaduran regional election
