= 1979 Spanish local elections in Extremadura =

This article presents the results breakdown of the local elections held in Extremadura on 3 April 1979. The following tables show detailed results in the autonomous community's most populous municipalities, sorted alphabetically.

== City control ==
The following table lists party control in the most populous municipalities, including provincial capitals (highlighted in bold).

Municipality	Population	New control
Almendralejo	23,123	Union of the Democratic Centre (UCD)
**Badajoz**	110,290	Union of the Democratic Centre (UCD)
**Cáceres**	63,181	Union of the Democratic Centre (UCD)
Mérida	39,165	Spanish Socialist Workers' Party (PSOE)
Plasencia	30,285	Union of the Democratic Centre (UCD)

== Municipalities ==
=== Almendralejo ===
Population: 23,123

Summary of the 3 April 1979 City Council of Almendralejo election results →
Parties and alliances	Popular vote			Seats	
Parties and alliances	Votes	%	±pp	Total	+/−
Union of the Democratic Centre (UCD)	4,465	41.59	n/a	**10**	n/a
Spanish Socialist Workers' Party (PSOE)	3,305	30.78	n/a	**7**	n/a
Communist Party of Spain (PCE)	972	9.05	n/a	**2**	n/a
Democratic Coalition (CD)	546	6.52	n/a	**2**	n/a
Workers' Revolutionary Organization (ORT)	433	4.03	n/a	0	n/a
Spanish Socialist Workers' Party (historical) (PSOEh)	412	3.84	n/a	0	n/a
Blank ballots	0	0.00	n/a		
**Total**	**10,736**			**21**	**n/a**
Valid votes	10,736	99.28	n/a		
Invalid votes	78	0.72	n/a		
**Votes cast / turnout**	**10,814**	**69.95**	**n/a**		
Abstentions	4,646	30.05	n/a		
**Registered voters**	**15,460**				

=== Badajoz ===
Population: 110,290

Summary of the 3 April 1979 City Council of Badajoz election results →
Parties and alliances	Popular vote			Seats	
Parties and alliances	Votes	%	±pp	Total	+/−
Union of the Democratic Centre (UCD)	20,634	48.43	n/a	**14**	n/a
Spanish Socialist Workers' Party (PSOE)	15,558	36.51	n/a	**10**	n/a
Communist Party of Spain (PCE)	4,791	11.24	n/a	**3**	n/a
National Union (UN)	850	1.99	n/a	0	n/a
Party of Labour of Spain (PTE)	777	1.82	n/a	0	n/a
Blank ballots	0	0.00	n/a		
**Total**	**42,610**			**27**	**n/a**
Valid votes	42,610	98.71	n/a		
Invalid votes	555	1.29	n/a		
**Votes cast / turnout**	**43,165**	**58.17**	**n/a**		
Abstentions	31,035	41.83	n/a		
**Registered voters**	**74,200**				

=== Cáceres ===
Population: 63,181

Summary of the 3 April 1979 City Council of Cáceres election results →
Parties and alliances	Popular vote			Seats	
Parties and alliances	Votes	%	±pp	Total	+/−
Union of the Democratic Centre (UCD)	10,968	40.53	n/a	**10**	n/a
Spanish Socialist Workers' Party (PSOE)	9,017	33.32	n/a	**9**	n/a
Independent Cáceres Group (ACI)	4,650	17.18	n/a	**4**	n/a
Communist Party of Spain (PCE)	2,425	8.96	n/a	**2**	n/a
Blank ballots	0	0.00	n/a		
**Total**	**27,060**			**25**	**n/a**
Valid votes	27,060	98.98	n/a		
Invalid votes	279	1.02	n/a		
**Votes cast / turnout**	**27,339**	**64.17**	**n/a**		
Abstentions	15,267	35.83	n/a		
**Registered voters**	**42,606**				

=== Mérida ===
Population: 39,165

Summary of the 3 April 1979 City Council of Mérida election results →
Parties and alliances	Popular vote			Seats	
Parties and alliances	Votes	%	±pp	Total	+/−
Union of the Democratic Centre (UCD)	7,659	46.02	n/a	**10**	n/a
Spanish Socialist Workers' Party (PSOE)	6,016	36.15	n/a	**8**	n/a
Workers' Revolutionary Organization (ORT)	2,300	13.82	n/a	**3**	n/a
Communist Party of Spain (PCE)	667	4.01	n/a	0	n/a
Blank ballots	0	0.00	n/a		
**Total**	**16,642**			**21**	**n/a**
Valid votes	16,642	99.11	n/a		
Invalid votes	150	0.89	n/a		
**Votes cast / turnout**	**16,792**	**63.47**	**n/a**		
Abstentions	9,663	36.53	n/a		
**Registered voters**	**26,455**				

=== Plasencia ===
Population: 30,285

Summary of the 3 April 1979 City Council of Plasencia election results →
Parties and alliances	Popular vote			Seats	
Parties and alliances	Votes	%	±pp	Total	+/−
Union of the Democratic Centre (UCD)	5,304	39.81	n/a	**9**	n/a
Spanish Socialist Workers' Party (PSOE)	3,515	26.38	n/a	**6**	n/a
Electoral Grouping (AGRUP/2)	2,703	20.29	n/a	**5**	n/a
Communist Party of Spain (PCE)	785	5.89	n/a	**1**	n/a
Workers' Revolutionary Organization (ORT)	449	3.37	n/a	0	n/a
Electoral Grouping (AGRUP/1)	292	2.19	n/a	0	n/a
Electoral Grouping (AGRUP/3)	276	2.07	n/a	0	n/a
Blank ballots	0	0.00	n/a		
**Total**	**13,324**			**21**	**n/a**
Valid votes	13,324	99.06	n/a		
Invalid votes	126	0.94	n/a		
**Votes cast / turnout**	**13,450**	**67.62**	**n/a**		
Abstentions	6,441	32.38	n/a		
**Registered voters**	**19,891**				
