= 1999 Spanish local elections in Extremadura =

This article presents the results breakdown of the local elections held in Extremadura on 13 June 1999. The following tables show detailed results in the autonomous community's most populous municipalities, sorted alphabetically.

== City control ==
The following table lists party control in the most populous municipalities, including provincial capitals (highlighted in bold). Gains for a party are highlighted in that party's colour.

Municipality	Population	Previous control	New control
Almendralejo	27,443	People's Party (PP)	People's Party (PP) (PSOE in 2000)
**Badajoz**	134,710	People's Party (PP)	People's Party (PP)
**Cáceres**	78,614	People's Party (PP)	People's Party (PP)
Mérida	50,471	People's Party (PP)	People's Party (PP)
Plasencia	36,465	People's Party (PP)	People's Party (PP) (CCPL in 2003)

== Municipalities ==
=== Almendralejo ===
Population: 27,443

← Summary of the 13 June 1999 City Council of Almendralejo election results →
Parties and alliances	Popular vote			Seats	
Parties and alliances	Votes	%	±pp	Total	+/−
People's Party (PP)	6,487	42.90	+5.40	**10**	+2
Spanish Socialist Workers' Party (PSOE)	6,398	42.31	+6.00	**10**	+2
United Left–Commitment to Extremadura (IU–CE)	900	5.95	−2.49	**1**	−1
Extremaduran Coalition (PREx–CREx)	703	4.65	−11.88	0	−3
Independent Socialists of Extremadura (SIEx)	270	1.79	New	0	±0
Blank ballots	362	2.39	+1.16		
**Total**	**15,120**			**21**	**±0**
Valid votes	15,120	99.26	−0.13		
Invalid votes	113	0.74	+0.13		
**Votes cast / turnout**	**15,223**	**72.11**	**−6.03**		
Abstentions	5,892	27.89	+6.03		
**Registered voters**	**21,125**				

=== Badajoz ===
Population: 134,710

← Summary of the 13 June 1999 City Council of Badajoz election results →
Parties and alliances	Popular vote			Seats	
Parties and alliances	Votes	%	±pp	Total	+/−
People's Party (PP)	36,970	56.38	+2.85	**16**	±0
Spanish Socialist Workers' Party (PSOE)	20,760	31.66	+2.73	**9**	+1
United Left–Commitment to Extremadura (IU–CE)	4,778	7.29	−6.08	**2**	−1
The Greens of Extremadura (LV)	628	0.96	New	0	±0
Extremaduran Coalition (PREx–CREx)	539	0.82	−2.01	0	±0
Independent Socialists of Extremadura (SIEx)	412	0.63	New	0	±0
United Extremadura (EU)	327	0.50	New	0	±0
Humanist Party (PH)	92	0.14	New	0	±0
Blank ballots	1,063	1.62	+0.41		
**Total**	**65,569**			**27**	**±0**
Valid votes	65,569	99.39	−0.11		
Invalid votes	402	0.61	+0.11		
**Votes cast / turnout**	**65,971**	**60.87**	**−11.40**		
Abstentions	42,412	39.13	+11.40		
**Registered voters**	**108,383**				

=== Cáceres ===
Population: 78,614

← Summary of the 13 June 1999 City Council of Cáceres election results →
Parties and alliances	Popular vote			Seats	
Parties and alliances	Votes	%	±pp	Total	+/−
People's Party (PP)	22,050	52.40	−3.92	**15**	±0
Spanish Socialist Workers' Party (PSOE)	14,179	33.69	+6.40	**9**	+2
United Left–Commitment to Extremadura (IU–CE)	2,241	5.33	−5.29	**1**	−2
United Extremadura (EU)	1,375	3.27	New	0	±0
Extremaduran Coalition (PREx–CREx)	492	1.17	−3.18	0	±0
The Greens of Extremadura (LV)	478	1.14	New	0	±0
Independent Socialists of Extremadura (SIEx)	218	0.52	New	0	±0
Spanish Democratic Party (PADE)	80	0.19	New	0	±0
Humanist Party (PH)	45	0.11	New	0	±0
Blank ballots	926	2.20	+0.78		
**Total**	**42,084**			**25**	**±0**
Valid votes	42,084	99.29	−0.18		
Invalid votes	301	0.71	+0.18		
**Votes cast / turnout**	**42,385**	**67.75**	**−4.03**		
Abstentions	20,180	32.25	+4.03		
**Registered voters**	**62,565**				

=== Mérida ===
Population: 50,471

← Summary of the 13 June 1999 City Council of Mérida election results →
Parties and alliances	Popular vote			Seats	
Parties and alliances	Votes	%	±pp	Total	+/−
People's Party (PP)	11,981	46.08	+6.17	**13**	+3
Spanish Socialist Workers' Party (PSOE)	9,301	35.77	+2.61	**10**	+1
United Left–Commitment to Extremadura (IU–CE)	2,196	8.45	−15.24	**2**	−4
Independent Socialists of Extremadura (SIEx)	1,066	4.10	+3.59	0	±0
United Extremadura (EU)	333	1.28	New	0	±0
Extremaduran Coalition (PREx–CREx)	227	0.87	−0.67	0	±0
Humanist Party (PH)	91	0.35	New	0	±0
Blank ballots	805	3.10	+1.92		
**Total**	**26,000**			**25**	**±0**
Valid votes	26,000	98.94	−0.37		
Invalid votes	278	1.06	+0.37		
**Votes cast / turnout**	**26,278**	**60.87**	**−10.56**		
Abstentions	13,284	39.13	+10.56		
**Registered voters**	**39,562**				

=== Plasencia ===
Population: 36,465

← Summary of the 13 June 1999 City Council of Plasencia election results →
Parties and alliances	Popular vote			Seats	
Parties and alliances	Votes	%	±pp	Total	+/−
People's Party (PP)	9,116	46.91	+0.98	**11**	+1
Spanish Socialist Workers' Party (PSOE)	7,584	39.03	+7.40	**9**	+2
Extremaduran Coalition (PREx–CREx)	1,186	6.10	−7.39	**1**	−2
United Left–Commitment to Extremadura (IU–CE)	786	4.04	−2.29	0	−1
United Extremadura (EU)	319	1.64	New	0	±0
Blank ballots	441	2.27	+0.68		
**Total**	**19,432**			**21**	**±0**
Valid votes	19,432	99.17	−0.17		
Invalid votes	163	0.83	+0.17		
**Votes cast / turnout**	**19,595**	**66.95**	**−16.00**		
Abstentions	9,673	33.05	+16.00		
**Registered voters**	**29,268**				

== See also ==
- 1999 Extremaduran regional election
