= Adolfo Díaz-Ambrona Bardají =

Spanish politician (1942–2012)

Adolfo Díaz-Ambrona Bardají (1 October 1942 – 27 July 2012) was a Spanish lawyer and politician. A member of the State Lawyers Corps, he founded the Extremadura branch of the People's Alliance (PA), which merged into the People's Party (PP) in 1989. He led his party in the Assembly of Extremadura from 1983 to 1991.

== Early life ==
Díaz-Ambrona was born into a political family in Badajoz. His father, Adolfo Díaz-Ambrona Moreno, was the Minister of Agriculture from 1965 to 1969 in the government of Francisco Franco, while his maternal grandfather Luis Bardají was also a state lawyer, and briefly Minister of Education in 1935 during the Second Spanish Republic. His brother Juan was president of the Provincial Deputation of Badajoz.

== Career ==
Díaz-Ambrona founded the branch of the People's Alliance (AP) in Extremadura. In the first regional election in 1983, the People's Coalition of AP, the People's Democratic Party (PDP) and Liberal Party (PL) came second, with Juan Carlos Rodríguez Ibarra of the Spanish Socialist Workers' Party (PSOE) becoming the first president. He also served in the Senate, representing the Assembly of Extremadura, from 1986 to 1987.

In March 1987, Díaz-Ambrona tabled a motion of no confidence in Ibarra. A cited reason was alleged irregularities in the awarding of contracts for a motorway between Trujillo and Guadalupe. The motion failed with 16 votes for (all from his parliamentary group), 36 against and 12 abstentions. In the June election, he was the again runner-up to Ibarra.

== Later life and death ==
After the end of his second term in 1991, Díaz-Ambrona returned to the legal profession. He and his wife Marisol García Cancho had six children.

He died of a pulmonary disease on 27 July 2012, aged 69. The following day, he was buried in the family mausoleum in Badajoz's San Juan cemetery, in a ceremony attended by local and regional politicians.
