= 2007 Spanish local elections in Extremadura =

This article presents the results breakdown of the local elections held in Extremadura on 27 May 2007. The following tables show detailed results in the autonomous community's most populous municipalities, sorted alphabetically.

== City control ==
The following table lists party control in the most populous municipalities, including provincial capitals (shown in bold). Gains for a party are displayed with the cell's background shaded in that party's colour.

Municipality	Population	Previous control	New control
Almendralejo	30,741	Spanish Socialist Workers' Party (PSOE)	Spanish Socialist Workers' Party (PSOE)
**Badajoz**	143,748	People's Party (PP)	People's Party (PP)
**Cáceres**	90,218	People's Party (PP)	Spanish Socialist Workers' Party (PSOE)
Mérida	53,915	People's Party (PP)	Spanish Socialist Workers' Party (PSOE)
Plasencia	39,785	Spanish Socialist Workers' Party (PSOE)	Spanish Socialist Workers' Party (PSOE)

== Municipalities ==
=== Almendralejo ===
Population: 30,741

← Summary of the 27 May 2007 City Council of Almendralejo election results →
Parties and alliances	Popular vote			Seats	
Parties and alliances	Votes	%	±pp	Total	+/−
Spanish Socialist Workers' Party (PSOE)	10,100	64.86	+11.60	**14**	+2
People's Party–United Extremadura (PP–EU)	4,283	27.51	−10.15	**6**	−2
United Left–Independent Socialists of Extremadura (IU–SIEx)	837	5.38	−0.88	**1**	±0
Blank ballots	351	2.25	−0.57		
**Total**	**15,571**			**21**	**±0**
Valid votes	15,571	99.00	+0.03		
Invalid votes	158	1.00	−0.03		
**Votes cast / turnout**	**15,729**	**67.55**	**−2.25**		
Abstentions	7,555	32.45	+2.25		
**Registered voters**	**23,284**				

=== Badajoz ===
Population: 143,748

← Summary of the 27 May 2007 City Council of Badajoz election results →
Parties and alliances	Popular vote			Seats	
Parties and alliances	Votes	%	±pp	Total	+/−
People's Party–United Extremadura (PP–EU)^{1}	33,937	49.59	−4.77	**15**	±0
Spanish Socialist Workers' Party (PSOE)	25,958	37.93	+0.93	**11**	±0
United Left (IU)	3,601	5.26	+0.20	**1**	±0
Your Badajoz (BT)	2,755	4.03	New	0	±0
The Greens of Extremadura (LV)	764	1.12	−0.43	0	±0
Humanist Party (PH)	150	0.22	+0.03	0	±0
Blank ballots	1,270	1.86	+0.21		
**Total**	**68,435**			**27**	**±0**
Valid votes	68,435	99.49	+0.21		
Invalid votes	354	0.51	−0.21		
**Votes cast / turnout**	**68,789**	**60.33**	**−3.47**		
Abstentions	45,230	39.67	+3.47		
**Registered voters**	**114,019**				
Sources
Footnotes: ^{1} People's Party–United Extremadura results are compared to the combined totals of the People's Party and United Extremadura in the 2003 election.

=== Cáceres ===
Population: 90,218

← Summary of the 27 May 2007 City Council of Cáceres election results →
Parties and alliances	Popular vote			Seats	
Parties and alliances	Votes	%	±pp	Total	+/−
People's Party–United Extremadura (PP–EU)^{1}	22,811	46.20	−5.63	**12**	−1
Spanish Socialist Workers' Party (PSOE)	19,541	39.58	−0.36	**11**	±0
Citizen Forum of Cáceres (FCC)	3,236	6.55	New	**1**	+1
United Left–Independent Socialists of Extremadura (IU–SIEx)	2,667	5.40	+0.21	**1**	±0
Blank ballots	1,115	2.26	−0.23		
**Total**	**49,370**			**25**	**±0**
Valid votes	49,370	99.22	+0.08		
Invalid votes	389	0.78	−0.08		
**Votes cast / turnout**	**49,759**	**69.13**	**−0.30**		
Abstentions	22,223	30.87	+0.30		
**Registered voters**	**71,982**				
Sources
Footnotes: ^{1} People's Party–United Extremadura results are compared to the combined totals of the People's Party and United Extremadura in the 2003 election.

=== Mérida ===
Population: 53,915

← Summary of the 27 May 2007 City Council of Mérida election results →
Parties and alliances	Popular vote			Seats	
Parties and alliances	Votes	%	±pp	Total	+/−
Spanish Socialist Workers' Party (PSOE)	14,590	47.80	+3.49	**13**	+1
People's Party–United Extremadura (PP–EU)^{1}	13,817	45.27	−0.10	**12**	−1
United Left–Independent Socialists of Extremadura (IU–SIEx)	1,010	3.31	−0.78	0	±0
The Greens of Extremadura (LV)	299	0.98	New	0	±0
Independents for Extremadura (IPEx)	209	0.68	New	0	±0
Humanist Party (PH)	56	0.18	New	0	±0
Blank ballots	540	1.77	−0.10		
**Total**	**30,521**			**25**	**±0**
Valid votes	30,521	99.49	+0.22		
Invalid votes	156	0.51	−0.22		
**Votes cast / turnout**	**30,677**	**70.92**	**+0.14**		
Abstentions	12,580	29.08	−0.14		
**Registered voters**	**43,257**				
Sources
Footnotes: ^{1} People's Party–United Extremadura results are compared to the combined totals of the People's Party and United Extremadura in the 2003 election.

=== Plasencia ===
Population: 39,785

← Summary of the 27 May 2007 City Council of Plasencia election results →
Parties and alliances	Popular vote			Seats	
Parties and alliances	Votes	%	±pp	Total	+/−
Spanish Socialist Workers' Party (PSOE)	9,514	44.68	+3.55	**10**	±0
People's Party–United Extremadura (PP–EU)^{1}	8,799	41.32	−8.82	**10**	−1
Extremaduran People's Union (UPEx)	1,536	7.21	New	**1**	+1
United Left–Independent Socialists of Extremadura (IU–SIEx)	1,007	4.73	+0.30	0	±0
Blank ballots	439	2.06	+0.06		
**Total**	**21,295**			**21**	**±0**
Valid votes	21,295	98.80	−0.27		
Invalid votes	259	1.20	+0.27		
**Votes cast / turnout**	**21,554**	**68.26**	**−1.82**		
Abstentions	10,023	31.74	+1.82		
**Registered voters**	**31,577**				
Sources
Footnotes: ^{1} People's Party–United Extremadura results are compared to the combined totals of the People's Party, Commitment to Plasencia and United Extremadura in the 2003 election.

== See also ==
- 2007 Extremaduran regional election
