= 2003 Spanish local elections in Extremadura =

This article presents the results breakdown of the local elections held in Extremadura on 25 May 2003. The following tables show detailed results in the autonomous community's most populous municipalities, sorted alphabetically.

== City control ==
The following table lists party control in the most populous municipalities, including provincial capitals (highlighted in bold). Gains for a party are highlighted in that party's colour.

Municipality	Population	Previous control	New control
Almendralejo	28,030	Spanish Socialist Workers' Party (PSOE)	Spanish Socialist Workers' Party (PSOE)
**Badajoz**	136,851	People's Party (PP)	People's Party (PP)
**Cáceres**	84,439	People's Party (PP)	People's Party (PP)
Mérida	50,780	People's Party (PP)	People's Party (PP)
Plasencia	38,495	Commitment to Plasencia (CCPL)	Spanish Socialist Workers' Party (PSOE)

== Municipalities ==
=== Almendralejo ===
Population: 28,030

← Summary of the 25 May 2003 City Council of Almendralejo election results →
Parties and alliances	Popular vote			Seats	
Parties and alliances	Votes	%	±pp	Total	+/−
Spanish Socialist Workers' Party (PSOE)^{1}	8,112	53.26	+6.30	**12**	+2
People's Party (PP)	5,736	37.66	−5.24	**8**	−2
United Left–Independent Socialists of Extremadura (IU–SIEx)^{2}	953	6.26	−1.48	**1**	±0
Blank ballots	430	2.82	+0.43		
**Total**	**15,231**			**21**	**±0**
Valid votes	15,231	98.97	−0.29		
Invalid votes	158	1.03	+0.29		
**Votes cast / turnout**	**15,389**	**69.80**	**−2.31**		
Abstentions	6,657	30.20	+2.31		
**Registered voters**	**22,046**				
Sources
Footnotes: ^{1} Spanish Socialist Workers' Party results are compared to the combined totals of Spanish Socialist Workers' Party and Extremaduran Coalition in the 1999 election.; ^{2} United Left–Independent Socialists of Extremadura results are compared to the combined totals of United Left–Commitment to Extremadura and Independent Socialists of Extremadura in the 1999 election.

=== Badajoz ===
Population: 136,851

← Summary of the 25 May 2003 City Council of Badajoz election results →
Parties and alliances	Popular vote			Seats	
Parties and alliances	Votes	%	±pp	Total	+/−
People's Party (PP)	37,092	53.68	−2.70	**15**	−1
Spanish Socialist Workers' Party (PSOE)^{1}	25,566	37.00	+4.52	**11**	+2
United Left–Independent Socialists of Extremadura (IU–SIEx)^{2}	3,495	5.06	−2.86	**1**	−1
The Greens of Extremadura (LV)	1,069	1.55	+0.59	0	±0
United Extremadura (EU)	470	0.68	+0.18	0	±0
Humanist Party (PH)	133	0.19	+0.05	0	±0
National Democracy (DN)	129	0.19	New	0	±0
Blank ballots	1,138	1.65	+0.03		
**Total**	**69,092**			**27**	**±0**
Valid votes	69,092	99.28	−0.11		
Invalid votes	502	0.72	+0.11		
**Votes cast / turnout**	**69,594**	**63.80**	**+2.93**		
Abstentions	39,481	36.20	−2.93		
**Registered voters**	**109,075**				
Sources
Footnotes: ^{1} Spanish Socialist Workers' Party results are compared to the combined totals of Spanish Socialist Workers' Party and Extremaduran Coalition in the 1999 election.; ^{2} United Left–Independent Socialists of Extremadura results are compared to the combined totals of United Left–Commitment to Extremadura and Independent Socialists of Extremadura in the 1999 election.

=== Cáceres ===
Population: 84,439

← Summary of the 25 May 2003 City Council of Cáceres election results →
Parties and alliances	Popular vote			Seats	
Parties and alliances	Votes	%	±pp	Total	+/−
People's Party (PP)	22,423	47.02	−5.38	**13**	−2
Spanish Socialist Workers' Party (PSOE)^{1}	19,046	39.94	+5.08	**11**	+2
United Left–Independent Socialists of Extremadura (IU–SIEx)^{2}	2,477	5.19	−0.66	**1**	±0
United Extremadura (EU)	2,293	4.81	+1.54	0	±0
Humanist Party (PH)	261	0.55	+0.44	0	±0
Blank ballots	1,188	2.49	+0.29		
**Total**	**47,688**			**25**	**±0**
Valid votes	47,688	99.14	−0.15		
Invalid votes	415	0.86	+0.15		
**Votes cast / turnout**	**48,103**	**69.43**	**+1.68**		
Abstentions	21,178	30.57	−1.68		
**Registered voters**	**69,281**				
Sources
Footnotes: ^{1} Spanish Socialist Workers' Party results are compared to the combined totals of Spanish Socialist Workers' Party and Extremaduran Coalition in the 1999 election.; ^{2} United Left–Independent Socialists of Extremadura results are compared to the combined totals of United Left–Commitment to Extremadura and Independent Socialists of Extremadura in the 1999 election.

=== Mérida ===
Population: 50,780

← Summary of the 25 May 2003 City Council of Mérida election results →
Parties and alliances	Popular vote			Seats	
Parties and alliances	Votes	%	±pp	Total	+/−
People's Party (PP)	12,970	44.68	−1.40	**13**	±0
Spanish Socialist Workers' Party (PSOE)^{1}	12,861	44.31	+7.67	**12**	+2
United Left–Commitment to Extremadura (IU–CE)	1,186	4.09	−4.36	0	−2
Independent Party of Capital Mérida (PIMC)	903	3.11	New	0	±0
Independent Socialists of Extremadura (SIEx)	366	1.26	−2.84	0	±0
United Extremadura (EU)	199	0.69	−0.59	0	±0
Blank ballots	542	1.87	−1.23		
**Total**	**29,027**			**25**	**±0**
Valid votes	29,027	99.27	+0.33		
Invalid votes	214	0.73	−0.33		
**Votes cast / turnout**	**29,241**	**70.78**	**+9.91**		
Abstentions	12,070	29.22	−9.91		
**Registered voters**	**41,311**				
Sources
Footnotes: ^{1} Spanish Socialist Workers' Party results are compared to the combined totals of Spanish Socialist Workers' Party and Extremaduran Coalition in the 1999 election.

=== Plasencia ===
Population: 38,495

← Summary of the 25 May 2003 City Council of Plasencia election results →
Parties and alliances	Popular vote			Seats	
Parties and alliances	Votes	%	±pp	Total	+/−
Spanish Socialist Workers' Party (PSOE)^{1}	8,764	41.13	−4.00	**10**	±0
People's Party (PP)	5,460	25.63	−21.28	**6**	−5
Commitment to Plasencia (CCPL)	4,638	21.77	New	**5**	+5
United Left–Independent Socialists of Extremadura (IU–SIEx)	944	4.43	+0.39	0	±0
United Extremadura (EU)	583	2.74	+1.10	0	±0
Extremaduran Democratic Socialist Platform (PDEx)	490	2.30	New	0	±0
Blank ballots	427	2.00	−0.27		
**Total**	**21,306**			**21**	**±0**
Valid votes	21,306	99.07	−0.10		
Invalid votes	200	0.93	+0.10		
**Votes cast / turnout**	**21,506**	**70.08**	**+3.13**		
Abstentions	9,183	29.92	−3.13		
**Registered voters**	**30,689**				
Sources
Footnotes: ^{1} Spanish Socialist Workers' Party results are compared to the combined totals of Spanish Socialist Workers' Party and Extremaduran Coalition in the 1999 election.

== See also ==
- 2003 Extremaduran regional election
