= Manuel Bermejo Hernández =

Spanish businessman and politician

- Born: 26 March 1936; Plasencia, Extremadura, Spain
- Died: 22 September 2009 (aged 73); Madrid, Spain
- Occupation: Politician
- Political party: Union of the Democratic Centre

Manuel Bermejo Hernández (26 March 1936 – 22 September 2009) was a Spanish businessman and politician from the Union of the Democratic Centre. He served as member of the first Congress of Deputies representing Cáceres.
