= Adolfo Díaz-Ambrona Moreno =

Spanish politician (1908–1971)

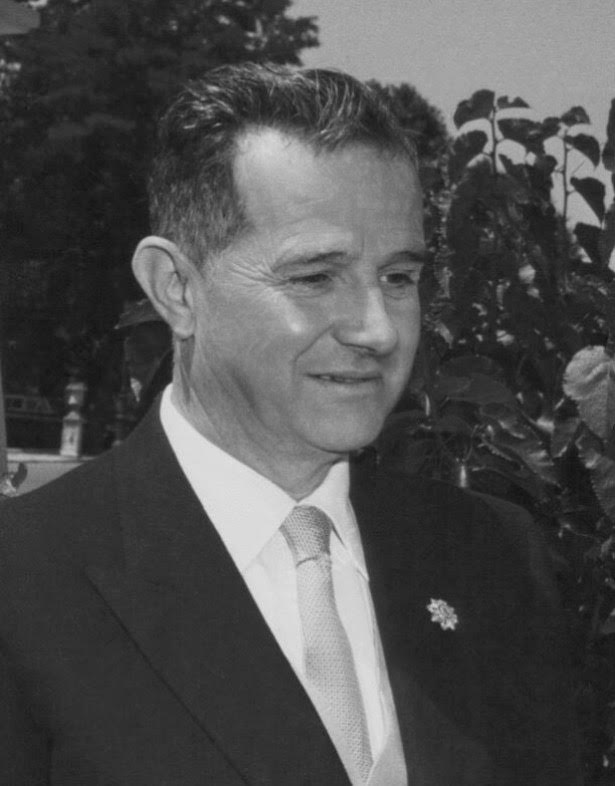

Minister of Agriculture of Spain
- In office 8 July 1965 – 30 October 1969
- Prime Minister: Francisco Franco
- Preceded by: Cirilo Cánovas
- Succeeded by: Tomás Allende y García-Baxter

Personal details
- Born: Adolfo Díaz-Ambrona Moreno; 26 July 1908 Badajoz, Kingdom of Spain
- Died: 17 December 1971 (aged 63) Madrid, Spanish State
- Party: FET y de las JONS

Adolfo Díaz-Ambrona Moreno (26 July 1908 – 17 December 1971) was a Spanish politician who served as Minister of Agriculture of Spain between 1965 and 1969, during the Francoist dictatorship. He was a member of FET y de las JONS.

His father-in-law was Luis Bardají, briefly Minister of Education in 1935 during the Second Spanish Republic. His son Adolfo Díaz-Ambrona Bardají founded the People's Alliance in Extremadura, and another son Juan was president of the Provincial Deputation of Badajoz.
