= Extremaduran Popular Bloc =

Extremaduran Popular Bloc Bloque Popular de Extremadura Bloque Populal d'Estremaura
- Chairman: Collective leadership
- Founded: 1981
- Dissolved: 1983
- Merger of: Communist Movement; Revolutionary Communist League; Ex-members of the Workers' Party; Unified Communist Party of Spain; Independents
- Headquarters: Cáceres
- Ideology: Communism; Extremaduran regionalism Extremaduran nationalism Revolutionary socialism Feminism
- Local seats (1981-1983): 37 / 3,547
- Local seats (1983-1987): 17 / 3,550

Party flag

Extremaduran Popular Bloc (Spanish: Bloque Popular de Extremadura, BPEx) was a communist political coalition created in Extremadura in 1981 and dissolved in 1983.

== History ==
BPEx was founded as a coalition of several political parties and movements in Extremadura, mainly the Communist Movement, the Revolutionary Communist League, the ex-members of the Workers' Party and the Unified Communist Party of Spain. The coalition was also supported by many independents of the social movements, like feminists and anti-militarists. Originally, the coalition "inherited" the 37 town councillors of the organizations which composed it.

The 13 of February 1983 the coalition called for a counter-demonstration against a right-wing anti-autonomist (called Bloque Cacereño Anti-Estatuto), being heavily repressed by the Spanish police.

In the local elections of 1983 the BPEx gained 17 town councillors. Shortly after that, the coalition de facto dissolved, although in some towns, like Majadas de Tiétar (where they were governing), the coalition continued to exist as the Extremeñist Revolutionary Bloc.

== Ideology ==
Ideologically they defined themselves as radical left "extremeñists revolutionaries", campaigning for an Statute of Autonomy for Extremadura.
