= Juan Carlos Rodríguez Ibarra =

Spanish politician (born 1948)

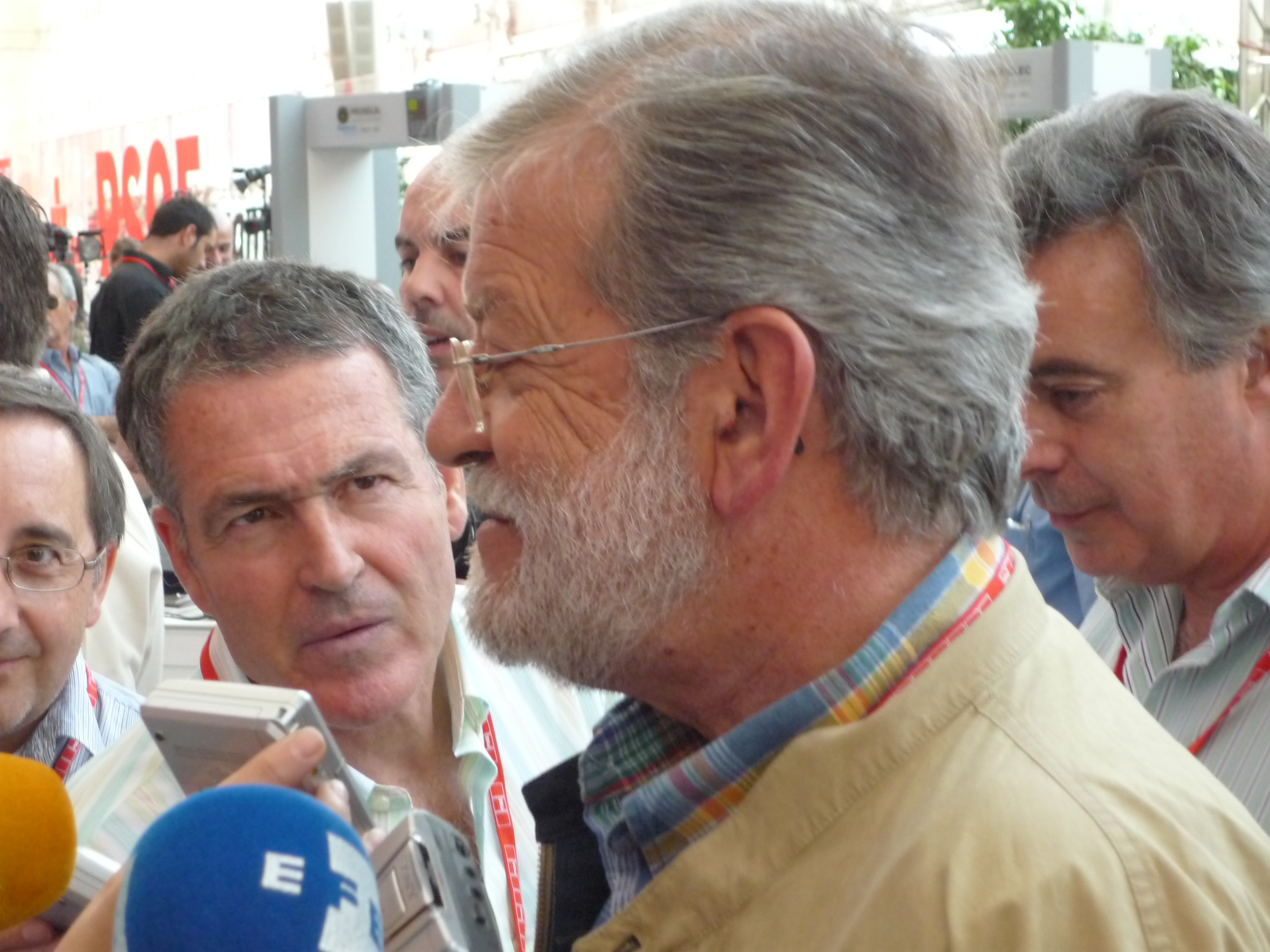

President of the Regional Government of Extremadura
- In office 5 March 1983 – 29 June 2007
- Monarch: Juan Carlos I
- Preceded by: Manuel Bermejo Hernández
- Succeeded by: Guillermo Fernández Vara

Secretary-General of the Socialist Workers' Party of Extremadura
- In office 16 April 1988 – 19 July 2008
- Preceded by: Office created
- Succeeded by: Guillermo Fernández Vara

Member of the Congress of Deputies
- In office 15 June 1977 – 26 May 1983
- Constituency: Badajoz

Member of the Assembly of Extremadura
- In office 26 May 1983 – 27 May 2007
- Constituency: Badajoz

Personal details
- Born: Juan Carlos Rodríguez Ibarra; 19 January 1948 (age 78) Mérida, Extremadura, Spain
- Party: Spanish Socialist Workers' Party

Juan Carlos Rodríguez Ibarra (born 19 January 1948) is a Spanish politician of the Spanish Socialist Workers' Party (PSOE). He was President of the Regional Government of Extremadura for 24 years (1983–2007).

== Biography ==
He gained a degree in philosophy from the University of Seville. In 1977 he was elected to the Spanish Congress of Deputies representing Badajoz region serving until 1983 when he resigned to become President of the autonomous community of Extremadura. He has also been deputy of the Assembly for Badajoz, General Secretary of PSOE of Extremadura, Executive Secretary of the Executive Federal Commission of the PSOE and teacher in commission of services for political matters of the Department of Hispanic Philology of the University of Extremadura in the Department of Education of Badajoz.

The University of Córdoba in Argentina granted him an honorary doctorate on 16 September 2003.

He is married to Leonor Godoy and has a daughter.

At the end of his term of office he was very criticised because of his support to the Balboa oil-refinery, property of his close friend Alfonso Gallardo, one of the most known businessman in the region.

Political offices
Preceded by Office Created	Councillor of Health and Social Security of Extremadura; 1978-1979	Succeeded by José García Arroyo
Preceded by Manuel Bermejo Hernández	President of the Regional Government of Extremadura; 1983–2007	Succeeded by Guillermo Fernández Vara
Party political offices
Preceded by Office created	Secretary-General of the Socialist Workers' Party of Extremadura; 1988–2008	Succeeded by Guillermo Fernández Vara
